

481001–481100 

|-bgcolor=#FA8072
| 481001 ||  || — || March 23, 2004 || Socorro || LINEAR || H || align=right data-sort-value="0.72" | 720 m || 
|-id=002 bgcolor=#E9E9E9
| 481002 ||  || — || April 14, 2004 || Kitt Peak || Spacewatch || — || align=right | 2.1 km || 
|-id=003 bgcolor=#E9E9E9
| 481003 ||  || — || March 26, 2004 || Kitt Peak || Spacewatch || GEF || align=right | 1.0 km || 
|-id=004 bgcolor=#d6d6d6
| 481004 ||  || — || May 15, 2004 || Socorro || LINEAR || Tj (2.95) || align=right | 3.3 km || 
|-id=005 bgcolor=#d6d6d6
| 481005 ||  || — || August 10, 2004 || Socorro || LINEAR || EOS || align=right | 2.0 km || 
|-id=006 bgcolor=#d6d6d6
| 481006 ||  || — || September 6, 2004 || St. Véran || Saint-Véran Obs. || — || align=right | 3.3 km || 
|-id=007 bgcolor=#d6d6d6
| 481007 ||  || — || September 7, 2004 || Kitt Peak || Spacewatch || EOS || align=right | 1.7 km || 
|-id=008 bgcolor=#fefefe
| 481008 ||  || — || August 9, 2004 || Socorro || LINEAR || — || align=right | 1.1 km || 
|-id=009 bgcolor=#d6d6d6
| 481009 ||  || — || September 7, 2004 || Palomar || NEAT || TIR || align=right | 2.3 km || 
|-id=010 bgcolor=#fefefe
| 481010 ||  || — || September 9, 2004 || Socorro || LINEAR || — || align=right data-sort-value="0.68" | 680 m || 
|-id=011 bgcolor=#fefefe
| 481011 ||  || — || August 25, 2004 || Kitt Peak || Spacewatch || V || align=right data-sort-value="0.58" | 580 m || 
|-id=012 bgcolor=#d6d6d6
| 481012 ||  || — || July 22, 1998 || Caussols || ODAS || — || align=right | 3.7 km || 
|-id=013 bgcolor=#fefefe
| 481013 ||  || — || August 11, 2004 || Socorro || LINEAR || — || align=right | 1.4 km || 
|-id=014 bgcolor=#fefefe
| 481014 ||  || — || September 11, 2004 || Socorro || LINEAR || — || align=right data-sort-value="0.93" | 930 m || 
|-id=015 bgcolor=#d6d6d6
| 481015 ||  || — || September 10, 2004 || Kitt Peak || Spacewatch || critical || align=right | 3.1 km || 
|-id=016 bgcolor=#d6d6d6
| 481016 ||  || — || September 10, 2004 || Kitt Peak || Spacewatch || — || align=right | 2.2 km || 
|-id=017 bgcolor=#fefefe
| 481017 ||  || — || October 4, 2004 || Kitt Peak || Spacewatch || — || align=right data-sort-value="0.81" | 810 m || 
|-id=018 bgcolor=#d6d6d6
| 481018 ||  || — || September 22, 2004 || Kitt Peak || Spacewatch || — || align=right | 2.1 km || 
|-id=019 bgcolor=#d6d6d6
| 481019 ||  || — || October 5, 2004 || Kitt Peak || Spacewatch || — || align=right | 2.5 km || 
|-id=020 bgcolor=#d6d6d6
| 481020 ||  || — || October 7, 2004 || Socorro || LINEAR || — || align=right | 4.3 km || 
|-id=021 bgcolor=#fefefe
| 481021 ||  || — || October 7, 2004 || Socorro || LINEAR || — || align=right data-sort-value="0.98" | 980 m || 
|-id=022 bgcolor=#fefefe
| 481022 ||  || — || October 9, 2004 || Socorro || LINEAR || MAS || align=right data-sort-value="0.98" | 980 m || 
|-id=023 bgcolor=#d6d6d6
| 481023 ||  || — || October 8, 2004 || Kitt Peak || Spacewatch || — || align=right | 2.8 km || 
|-id=024 bgcolor=#d6d6d6
| 481024 ||  || — || October 20, 2004 || Socorro || LINEAR || Tj (2.98) || align=right | 3.9 km || 
|-id=025 bgcolor=#FFC2E0
| 481025 ||  || — || November 3, 2004 || Socorro || LINEAR || APO || align=right data-sort-value="0.28" | 280 m || 
|-id=026 bgcolor=#d6d6d6
| 481026 ||  || — || November 4, 2004 || Kitt Peak || Spacewatch || — || align=right | 3.4 km || 
|-id=027 bgcolor=#FFC2E0
| 481027 ||  || — || December 13, 2004 || Mauna Kea || D. J. Tholen || AMOcritical || align=right data-sort-value="0.71" | 710 m || 
|-id=028 bgcolor=#d6d6d6
| 481028 ||  || — || November 30, 2004 || Anderson Mesa || LONEOS || — || align=right | 3.7 km || 
|-id=029 bgcolor=#E9E9E9
| 481029 ||  || — || December 10, 2004 || Kitt Peak || Spacewatch || — || align=right data-sort-value="0.94" | 940 m || 
|-id=030 bgcolor=#E9E9E9
| 481030 ||  || — || December 18, 2004 || Mount Lemmon || Mount Lemmon Survey || — || align=right | 1.1 km || 
|-id=031 bgcolor=#C2FFFF
| 481031 ||  || — || December 18, 2004 || Mount Lemmon || Mount Lemmon Survey || L5 || align=right | 8.9 km || 
|-id=032 bgcolor=#FFC2E0
| 481032 ||  || — || December 22, 2004 || Siding Spring || SSS || AMO +1km || align=right | 3.4 km || 
|-id=033 bgcolor=#E9E9E9
| 481033 ||  || — || January 15, 2005 || Kvistaberg || UDAS || — || align=right | 1.0 km || 
|-id=034 bgcolor=#E9E9E9
| 481034 ||  || — || January 15, 2005 || Kitt Peak || Spacewatch || — || align=right | 1.0 km || 
|-id=035 bgcolor=#E9E9E9
| 481035 ||  || — || January 15, 2005 || Kitt Peak || Spacewatch || — || align=right data-sort-value="0.70" | 700 m || 
|-id=036 bgcolor=#E9E9E9
| 481036 ||  || — || January 16, 2005 || Mauna Kea || C. Veillet || — || align=right | 1.1 km || 
|-id=037 bgcolor=#E9E9E9
| 481037 ||  || — || February 1, 2005 || Kitt Peak || Spacewatch || — || align=right data-sort-value="0.89" | 890 m || 
|-id=038 bgcolor=#E9E9E9
| 481038 ||  || — || February 2, 2005 || Catalina || CSS || — || align=right data-sort-value="0.98" | 980 m || 
|-id=039 bgcolor=#E9E9E9
| 481039 ||  || — || March 1, 2005 || Catalina || CSS || — || align=right | 1.7 km || 
|-id=040 bgcolor=#fefefe
| 481040 ||  || — || March 3, 2005 || Kitt Peak || Spacewatch || — || align=right data-sort-value="0.52" | 520 m || 
|-id=041 bgcolor=#E9E9E9
| 481041 ||  || — || March 9, 2005 || Mount Lemmon || Mount Lemmon Survey || — || align=right data-sort-value="0.76" | 760 m || 
|-id=042 bgcolor=#E9E9E9
| 481042 ||  || — || January 13, 2005 || Kitt Peak || Spacewatch || — || align=right | 1.2 km || 
|-id=043 bgcolor=#E9E9E9
| 481043 ||  || — || March 11, 2005 || Mount Lemmon || Mount Lemmon Survey || EUN || align=right data-sort-value="0.99" | 990 m || 
|-id=044 bgcolor=#FA8072
| 481044 ||  || — || March 15, 2005 || Catalina || CSS || — || align=right | 1.8 km || 
|-id=045 bgcolor=#E9E9E9
| 481045 ||  || — || March 11, 2005 || Mount Lemmon || Mount Lemmon Survey || — || align=right | 1.3 km || 
|-id=046 bgcolor=#E9E9E9
| 481046 ||  || — || March 18, 2005 || Catalina || CSS || — || align=right | 1.6 km || 
|-id=047 bgcolor=#E9E9E9
| 481047 ||  || — || March 31, 2005 || Catalina || CSS || — || align=right | 1.6 km || 
|-id=048 bgcolor=#E9E9E9
| 481048 ||  || — || April 1, 2005 || Siding Spring || SSS || — || align=right | 2.9 km || 
|-id=049 bgcolor=#E9E9E9
| 481049 ||  || — || April 1, 2005 || Anderson Mesa || LONEOS || — || align=right | 1.7 km || 
|-id=050 bgcolor=#FA8072
| 481050 ||  || — || April 4, 2005 || Socorro || LINEAR || — || align=right data-sort-value="0.67" | 670 m || 
|-id=051 bgcolor=#E9E9E9
| 481051 ||  || — || April 5, 2005 || Mount Lemmon || Mount Lemmon Survey || — || align=right | 1.4 km || 
|-id=052 bgcolor=#FFC2E0
| 481052 ||  || — || April 30, 2005 || Siding Spring || SSS || AMO || align=right data-sort-value="0.27" | 270 m || 
|-id=053 bgcolor=#fefefe
| 481053 ||  || — || May 3, 2005 || Kitt Peak || DLS || H || align=right data-sort-value="0.63" | 630 m || 
|-id=054 bgcolor=#E9E9E9
| 481054 ||  || — || May 7, 2005 || Kitt Peak || Spacewatch || EUN || align=right | 1.1 km || 
|-id=055 bgcolor=#d6d6d6
| 481055 ||  || — || May 9, 2005 || Kitt Peak || Spacewatch || — || align=right | 2.9 km || 
|-id=056 bgcolor=#E9E9E9
| 481056 ||  || — || June 13, 2005 || Mount Lemmon || Mount Lemmon Survey || JUNfast? || align=right | 1.2 km || 
|-id=057 bgcolor=#d6d6d6
| 481057 ||  || — || June 12, 2005 || Kitt Peak || Spacewatch || — || align=right | 3.0 km || 
|-id=058 bgcolor=#fefefe
| 481058 ||  || — || June 30, 2005 || Kitt Peak || Spacewatch || H || align=right data-sort-value="0.64" | 640 m || 
|-id=059 bgcolor=#d6d6d6
| 481059 ||  || — || June 29, 2005 || Kitt Peak || Spacewatch || — || align=right | 4.4 km || 
|-id=060 bgcolor=#E9E9E9
| 481060 ||  || — || June 30, 2005 || Kitt Peak || Spacewatch || — || align=right | 2.7 km || 
|-id=061 bgcolor=#fefefe
| 481061 ||  || — || July 5, 2005 || Kitt Peak || Spacewatch || V || align=right data-sort-value="0.63" | 630 m || 
|-id=062 bgcolor=#fefefe
| 481062 ||  || — || July 6, 2005 || Siding Spring || SSS || — || align=right data-sort-value="0.80" | 800 m || 
|-id=063 bgcolor=#FA8072
| 481063 ||  || — || July 28, 2005 || Palomar || NEAT || — || align=right data-sort-value="0.83" | 830 m || 
|-id=064 bgcolor=#fefefe
| 481064 ||  || — || July 25, 2005 || Siding Spring || SSS || — || align=right data-sort-value="0.79" | 790 m || 
|-id=065 bgcolor=#fefefe
| 481065 ||  || — || August 27, 2005 || Kitt Peak || Spacewatch || critical || align=right data-sort-value="0.59" | 590 m || 
|-id=066 bgcolor=#fefefe
| 481066 ||  || — || August 28, 2005 || Kitt Peak || Spacewatch || — || align=right data-sort-value="0.66" | 660 m || 
|-id=067 bgcolor=#fefefe
| 481067 ||  || — || August 25, 2005 || Palomar || NEAT || NYS || align=right data-sort-value="0.62" | 620 m || 
|-id=068 bgcolor=#fefefe
| 481068 ||  || — || August 28, 2005 || Kitt Peak || Spacewatch || — || align=right data-sort-value="0.59" | 590 m || 
|-id=069 bgcolor=#d6d6d6
| 481069 ||  || — || August 28, 2005 || Kitt Peak || Spacewatch || — || align=right | 1.8 km || 
|-id=070 bgcolor=#fefefe
| 481070 ||  || — || August 28, 2005 || Kitt Peak || Spacewatch || — || align=right data-sort-value="0.82" | 820 m || 
|-id=071 bgcolor=#fefefe
| 481071 ||  || — || August 30, 2005 || Kitt Peak || Spacewatch || — || align=right data-sort-value="0.71" | 710 m || 
|-id=072 bgcolor=#d6d6d6
| 481072 ||  || — || August 31, 2005 || Kitt Peak || Spacewatch || — || align=right | 2.1 km || 
|-id=073 bgcolor=#d6d6d6
| 481073 ||  || — || September 1, 2005 || Anderson Mesa || LONEOS || Tj (2.96) || align=right | 3.1 km || 
|-id=074 bgcolor=#d6d6d6
| 481074 ||  || — || September 23, 2005 || Kitt Peak || Spacewatch || — || align=right | 2.3 km || 
|-id=075 bgcolor=#d6d6d6
| 481075 ||  || — || September 25, 2005 || Goodricke-Pigott || R. A. Tucker || — || align=right | 2.9 km || 
|-id=076 bgcolor=#d6d6d6
| 481076 ||  || — || September 25, 2005 || Kingsnake || J. V. McClusky || — || align=right | 3.5 km || 
|-id=077 bgcolor=#fefefe
| 481077 ||  || — || September 23, 2005 || Kitt Peak || Spacewatch || NYS || align=right data-sort-value="0.65" | 650 m || 
|-id=078 bgcolor=#d6d6d6
| 481078 ||  || — || September 24, 2005 || Kitt Peak || Spacewatch || EOS || align=right | 1.4 km || 
|-id=079 bgcolor=#d6d6d6
| 481079 ||  || — || September 24, 2005 || Kitt Peak || Spacewatch || — || align=right | 3.2 km || 
|-id=080 bgcolor=#d6d6d6
| 481080 ||  || — || September 24, 2005 || Kitt Peak || Spacewatch || — || align=right | 2.5 km || 
|-id=081 bgcolor=#fefefe
| 481081 ||  || — || September 25, 2005 || Kitt Peak || Spacewatch || V || align=right data-sort-value="0.55" | 550 m || 
|-id=082 bgcolor=#fefefe
| 481082 ||  || — || September 25, 2005 || Kitt Peak || Spacewatch || — || align=right data-sort-value="0.66" | 660 m || 
|-id=083 bgcolor=#d6d6d6
| 481083 ||  || — || September 24, 2005 || Kitt Peak || Spacewatch || — || align=right | 3.0 km || 
|-id=084 bgcolor=#fefefe
| 481084 ||  || — || September 29, 2005 || Mount Lemmon || Mount Lemmon Survey || — || align=right data-sort-value="0.71" | 710 m || 
|-id=085 bgcolor=#FA8072
| 481085 ||  || — || September 30, 2005 || Catalina || CSS || — || align=right | 1.2 km || 
|-id=086 bgcolor=#d6d6d6
| 481086 ||  || — || September 25, 2005 || Kitt Peak || Spacewatch || — || align=right | 1.9 km || 
|-id=087 bgcolor=#fefefe
| 481087 ||  || — || September 25, 2005 || Kitt Peak || Spacewatch || — || align=right data-sort-value="0.70" | 700 m || 
|-id=088 bgcolor=#d6d6d6
| 481088 ||  || — || September 29, 2005 || Kitt Peak || Spacewatch || — || align=right | 2.4 km || 
|-id=089 bgcolor=#d6d6d6
| 481089 ||  || — || September 29, 2005 || Kitt Peak || Spacewatch || — || align=right | 2.0 km || 
|-id=090 bgcolor=#FA8072
| 481090 ||  || — || September 29, 2005 || Anderson Mesa || LONEOS || — || align=right data-sort-value="0.67" | 670 m || 
|-id=091 bgcolor=#d6d6d6
| 481091 ||  || — || September 29, 2005 || Kitt Peak || Spacewatch || — || align=right | 2.2 km || 
|-id=092 bgcolor=#fefefe
| 481092 ||  || — || September 29, 2005 || Mount Lemmon || Mount Lemmon Survey || — || align=right data-sort-value="0.61" | 610 m || 
|-id=093 bgcolor=#fefefe
| 481093 ||  || — || September 30, 2005 || Kitt Peak || Spacewatch || — || align=right data-sort-value="0.95" | 950 m || 
|-id=094 bgcolor=#d6d6d6
| 481094 ||  || — || September 30, 2005 || Mount Lemmon || Mount Lemmon Survey || — || align=right | 2.4 km || 
|-id=095 bgcolor=#d6d6d6
| 481095 ||  || — || September 30, 2005 || Mount Lemmon || Mount Lemmon Survey || — || align=right | 2.5 km || 
|-id=096 bgcolor=#fefefe
| 481096 ||  || — || September 29, 2005 || Kitt Peak || Spacewatch || — || align=right data-sort-value="0.60" | 600 m || 
|-id=097 bgcolor=#fefefe
| 481097 ||  || — || September 29, 2005 || Kitt Peak || Spacewatch || — || align=right data-sort-value="0.71" | 710 m || 
|-id=098 bgcolor=#fefefe
| 481098 ||  || — || September 23, 2005 || Kitt Peak || Spacewatch || NYS || align=right data-sort-value="0.60" | 600 m || 
|-id=099 bgcolor=#d6d6d6
| 481099 ||  || — || September 29, 2005 || Siding Spring || SSS || — || align=right | 3.6 km || 
|-id=100 bgcolor=#fefefe
| 481100 ||  || — || September 29, 2005 || Mount Lemmon || Mount Lemmon Survey || critical || align=right data-sort-value="0.54" | 540 m || 
|}

481101–481200 

|-bgcolor=#fefefe
| 481101 ||  || — || October 1, 2005 || Catalina || CSS || — || align=right data-sort-value="0.71" | 710 m || 
|-id=102 bgcolor=#FA8072
| 481102 ||  || — || October 1, 2005 || Socorro || LINEAR || — || align=right data-sort-value="0.78" | 780 m || 
|-id=103 bgcolor=#fefefe
| 481103 ||  || — || October 1, 2005 || Mount Lemmon || Mount Lemmon Survey || — || align=right data-sort-value="0.62" | 620 m || 
|-id=104 bgcolor=#fefefe
| 481104 ||  || — || September 24, 2005 || Kitt Peak || Spacewatch || — || align=right data-sort-value="0.71" | 710 m || 
|-id=105 bgcolor=#d6d6d6
| 481105 ||  || — || October 7, 2005 || Catalina || CSS || — || align=right | 2.8 km || 
|-id=106 bgcolor=#d6d6d6
| 481106 ||  || — || October 6, 2005 || Kitt Peak || Spacewatch || — || align=right | 2.9 km || 
|-id=107 bgcolor=#d6d6d6
| 481107 ||  || — || October 7, 2005 || Mount Lemmon || Mount Lemmon Survey || — || align=right | 3.5 km || 
|-id=108 bgcolor=#fefefe
| 481108 ||  || — || September 29, 2005 || Mount Lemmon || Mount Lemmon Survey || — || align=right data-sort-value="0.67" | 670 m || 
|-id=109 bgcolor=#fefefe
| 481109 ||  || — || September 27, 2005 || Kitt Peak || Spacewatch || — || align=right data-sort-value="0.68" | 680 m || 
|-id=110 bgcolor=#d6d6d6
| 481110 ||  || — || October 7, 2005 || Kitt Peak || Spacewatch || — || align=right | 2.2 km || 
|-id=111 bgcolor=#d6d6d6
| 481111 ||  || — || October 7, 2005 || Kitt Peak || Spacewatch || THM || align=right | 2.3 km || 
|-id=112 bgcolor=#d6d6d6
| 481112 ||  || — || October 7, 2005 || Kitt Peak || Spacewatch || — || align=right | 2.4 km || 
|-id=113 bgcolor=#fefefe
| 481113 ||  || — || October 7, 2005 || Kitt Peak || Spacewatch || — || align=right data-sort-value="0.71" | 710 m || 
|-id=114 bgcolor=#d6d6d6
| 481114 ||  || — || September 30, 2005 || Mount Lemmon || Mount Lemmon Survey || — || align=right | 2.1 km || 
|-id=115 bgcolor=#d6d6d6
| 481115 ||  || — || October 7, 2005 || Kitt Peak || Spacewatch || — || align=right | 1.8 km || 
|-id=116 bgcolor=#d6d6d6
| 481116 ||  || — || September 24, 2005 || Kitt Peak || Spacewatch || EOS || align=right | 1.5 km || 
|-id=117 bgcolor=#d6d6d6
| 481117 ||  || — || October 8, 2005 || Kitt Peak || Spacewatch || — || align=right | 2.0 km || 
|-id=118 bgcolor=#d6d6d6
| 481118 ||  || — || October 8, 2005 || Kitt Peak || Spacewatch || — || align=right | 3.1 km || 
|-id=119 bgcolor=#fefefe
| 481119 ||  || — || October 8, 2005 || Kitt Peak || Spacewatch || — || align=right data-sort-value="0.61" | 610 m || 
|-id=120 bgcolor=#fefefe
| 481120 ||  || — || September 29, 2005 || Kitt Peak || Spacewatch || — || align=right data-sort-value="0.82" | 820 m || 
|-id=121 bgcolor=#d6d6d6
| 481121 ||  || — || October 7, 2005 || Mount Lemmon || Mount Lemmon Survey || — || align=right | 2.0 km || 
|-id=122 bgcolor=#fefefe
| 481122 ||  || — || September 26, 2005 || Kitt Peak || Spacewatch || — || align=right data-sort-value="0.67" | 670 m || 
|-id=123 bgcolor=#fefefe
| 481123 ||  || — || October 10, 2005 || Catalina || CSS || — || align=right | 1.1 km || 
|-id=124 bgcolor=#d6d6d6
| 481124 ||  || — || October 3, 2005 || Kitt Peak || Spacewatch || EOS || align=right | 1.7 km || 
|-id=125 bgcolor=#fefefe
| 481125 ||  || — || October 7, 2005 || Anderson Mesa || LONEOS || — || align=right data-sort-value="0.69" | 690 m || 
|-id=126 bgcolor=#fefefe
| 481126 ||  || — || October 23, 2005 || Palomar || NEAT || — || align=right | 2.3 km || 
|-id=127 bgcolor=#FFC2E0
| 481127 ||  || — || October 28, 2005 || Catalina || CSS || APOcritical || align=right data-sort-value="0.18" | 180 m || 
|-id=128 bgcolor=#fefefe
| 481128 ||  || — || October 6, 2005 || Mount Lemmon || Mount Lemmon Survey || — || align=right data-sort-value="0.76" | 760 m || 
|-id=129 bgcolor=#d6d6d6
| 481129 ||  || — || October 12, 2005 || Kitt Peak || Spacewatch || — || align=right | 3.0 km || 
|-id=130 bgcolor=#fefefe
| 481130 ||  || — || October 1, 2005 || Mount Lemmon || Mount Lemmon Survey || MAS || align=right data-sort-value="0.72" | 720 m || 
|-id=131 bgcolor=#fefefe
| 481131 ||  || — || October 23, 2005 || Kitt Peak || Spacewatch || — || align=right data-sort-value="0.62" | 620 m || 
|-id=132 bgcolor=#fefefe
| 481132 ||  || — || September 30, 2005 || Mount Lemmon || Mount Lemmon Survey || V || align=right data-sort-value="0.76" | 760 m || 
|-id=133 bgcolor=#fefefe
| 481133 ||  || — || October 5, 2005 || Kitt Peak || Spacewatch || — || align=right data-sort-value="0.78" | 780 m || 
|-id=134 bgcolor=#fefefe
| 481134 ||  || — || October 24, 2005 || Kitt Peak || Spacewatch || — || align=right data-sort-value="0.58" | 580 m || 
|-id=135 bgcolor=#fefefe
| 481135 ||  || — || October 22, 2005 || Kitt Peak || Spacewatch || H || align=right data-sort-value="0.57" | 570 m || 
|-id=136 bgcolor=#fefefe
| 481136 ||  || — || October 24, 2005 || Anderson Mesa || LONEOS || — || align=right data-sort-value="0.78" | 780 m || 
|-id=137 bgcolor=#d6d6d6
| 481137 ||  || — || October 25, 2005 || Kitt Peak || Spacewatch || — || align=right | 3.2 km || 
|-id=138 bgcolor=#d6d6d6
| 481138 ||  || — || October 25, 2005 || Mount Lemmon || Mount Lemmon Survey || — || align=right | 3.2 km || 
|-id=139 bgcolor=#fefefe
| 481139 ||  || — || October 22, 2005 || Palomar || NEAT || — || align=right data-sort-value="0.71" | 710 m || 
|-id=140 bgcolor=#d6d6d6
| 481140 ||  || — || October 25, 2005 || Catalina || CSS || — || align=right | 2.7 km || 
|-id=141 bgcolor=#d6d6d6
| 481141 ||  || — || October 22, 2005 || Kitt Peak || Spacewatch || EOS || align=right | 1.7 km || 
|-id=142 bgcolor=#fefefe
| 481142 ||  || — || October 22, 2005 || Kitt Peak || Spacewatch || — || align=right data-sort-value="0.77" | 770 m || 
|-id=143 bgcolor=#fefefe
| 481143 ||  || — || October 22, 2005 || Kitt Peak || Spacewatch || H || align=right data-sort-value="0.56" | 560 m || 
|-id=144 bgcolor=#fefefe
| 481144 ||  || — || October 22, 2005 || Kitt Peak || Spacewatch || — || align=right data-sort-value="0.75" | 750 m || 
|-id=145 bgcolor=#d6d6d6
| 481145 ||  || — || October 22, 2005 || Kitt Peak || Spacewatch || — || align=right | 3.7 km || 
|-id=146 bgcolor=#d6d6d6
| 481146 ||  || — || October 24, 2005 || Kitt Peak || Spacewatch || — || align=right | 1.5 km || 
|-id=147 bgcolor=#d6d6d6
| 481147 ||  || — || October 24, 2005 || Kitt Peak || Spacewatch || — || align=right | 1.6 km || 
|-id=148 bgcolor=#fefefe
| 481148 ||  || — || October 24, 2005 || Kitt Peak || Spacewatch || — || align=right data-sort-value="0.64" | 640 m || 
|-id=149 bgcolor=#d6d6d6
| 481149 ||  || — || October 24, 2005 || Kitt Peak || Spacewatch || — || align=right | 3.8 km || 
|-id=150 bgcolor=#d6d6d6
| 481150 ||  || — || October 26, 2005 || Kitt Peak || Spacewatch || — || align=right | 2.5 km || 
|-id=151 bgcolor=#fefefe
| 481151 ||  || — || October 23, 2005 || Catalina || CSS || NYS || align=right data-sort-value="0.64" | 640 m || 
|-id=152 bgcolor=#fefefe
| 481152 ||  || — || October 22, 2005 || Catalina || CSS || — || align=right data-sort-value="0.78" | 780 m || 
|-id=153 bgcolor=#d6d6d6
| 481153 ||  || — || September 29, 2005 || Kitt Peak || Spacewatch || — || align=right | 1.8 km || 
|-id=154 bgcolor=#d6d6d6
| 481154 ||  || — || October 6, 2005 || Mount Lemmon || Mount Lemmon Survey || — || align=right | 2.0 km || 
|-id=155 bgcolor=#d6d6d6
| 481155 ||  || — || October 24, 2005 || Kitt Peak || Spacewatch || — || align=right | 3.2 km || 
|-id=156 bgcolor=#d6d6d6
| 481156 ||  || — || October 24, 2005 || Kitt Peak || Spacewatch || — || align=right | 2.7 km || 
|-id=157 bgcolor=#fefefe
| 481157 ||  || — || October 25, 2005 || Kitt Peak || Spacewatch || — || align=right data-sort-value="0.79" | 790 m || 
|-id=158 bgcolor=#fefefe
| 481158 ||  || — || October 27, 2005 || Mount Lemmon || Mount Lemmon Survey || NYS || align=right data-sort-value="0.42" | 420 m || 
|-id=159 bgcolor=#fefefe
| 481159 ||  || — || October 27, 2005 || Mount Lemmon || Mount Lemmon Survey || — || align=right data-sort-value="0.57" | 570 m || 
|-id=160 bgcolor=#d6d6d6
| 481160 ||  || — || October 22, 2005 || Kitt Peak || Spacewatch || — || align=right | 2.2 km || 
|-id=161 bgcolor=#d6d6d6
| 481161 ||  || — || October 24, 2005 || Kitt Peak || Spacewatch || — || align=right | 3.2 km || 
|-id=162 bgcolor=#fefefe
| 481162 ||  || — || October 25, 2005 || Kitt Peak || Spacewatch || — || align=right data-sort-value="0.61" | 610 m || 
|-id=163 bgcolor=#fefefe
| 481163 ||  || — || October 25, 2005 || Kitt Peak || Spacewatch || MAS || align=right data-sort-value="0.55" | 550 m || 
|-id=164 bgcolor=#d6d6d6
| 481164 ||  || — || October 27, 2005 || Kitt Peak || Spacewatch || — || align=right | 2.5 km || 
|-id=165 bgcolor=#d6d6d6
| 481165 ||  || — || October 27, 2005 || Kitt Peak || Spacewatch || THM || align=right | 2.1 km || 
|-id=166 bgcolor=#d6d6d6
| 481166 ||  || — || October 22, 2005 || Kitt Peak || Spacewatch || — || align=right | 1.9 km || 
|-id=167 bgcolor=#fefefe
| 481167 ||  || — || October 25, 2005 || Kitt Peak || Spacewatch || — || align=right data-sort-value="0.73" | 730 m || 
|-id=168 bgcolor=#fefefe
| 481168 ||  || — || October 25, 2005 || Kitt Peak || Spacewatch || — || align=right data-sort-value="0.80" | 800 m || 
|-id=169 bgcolor=#d6d6d6
| 481169 ||  || — || October 25, 2005 || Kitt Peak || Spacewatch || — || align=right | 2.1 km || 
|-id=170 bgcolor=#d6d6d6
| 481170 ||  || — || October 25, 2005 || Kitt Peak || Spacewatch || (8737) || align=right | 3.2 km || 
|-id=171 bgcolor=#d6d6d6
| 481171 ||  || — || October 25, 2005 || Mount Lemmon || Mount Lemmon Survey || THM || align=right | 1.6 km || 
|-id=172 bgcolor=#fefefe
| 481172 ||  || — || October 25, 2005 || Mount Lemmon || Mount Lemmon Survey || — || align=right data-sort-value="0.66" | 660 m || 
|-id=173 bgcolor=#d6d6d6
| 481173 ||  || — || October 25, 2005 || Kitt Peak || Spacewatch || — || align=right | 2.1 km || 
|-id=174 bgcolor=#d6d6d6
| 481174 ||  || — || October 25, 2005 || Kitt Peak || Spacewatch || — || align=right | 2.8 km || 
|-id=175 bgcolor=#fefefe
| 481175 ||  || — || October 27, 2005 || Anderson Mesa || LONEOS || — || align=right data-sort-value="0.88" | 880 m || 
|-id=176 bgcolor=#d6d6d6
| 481176 ||  || — || September 23, 2005 || Kitt Peak || Spacewatch || — || align=right | 2.2 km || 
|-id=177 bgcolor=#fefefe
| 481177 ||  || — || October 27, 2005 || Kitt Peak || Spacewatch || — || align=right data-sort-value="0.60" | 600 m || 
|-id=178 bgcolor=#d6d6d6
| 481178 ||  || — || October 27, 2005 || Kitt Peak || Spacewatch || — || align=right | 2.9 km || 
|-id=179 bgcolor=#d6d6d6
| 481179 ||  || — || September 30, 2005 || Mount Lemmon || Mount Lemmon Survey || — || align=right | 2.4 km || 
|-id=180 bgcolor=#d6d6d6
| 481180 ||  || — || October 24, 2005 || Kitt Peak || Spacewatch || — || align=right | 3.8 km || 
|-id=181 bgcolor=#fefefe
| 481181 ||  || — || October 26, 2005 || Kitt Peak || Spacewatch || — || align=right data-sort-value="0.79" | 790 m || 
|-id=182 bgcolor=#d6d6d6
| 481182 ||  || — || October 27, 2005 || Mount Lemmon || Mount Lemmon Survey || — || align=right | 2.1 km || 
|-id=183 bgcolor=#fefefe
| 481183 ||  || — || October 25, 2005 || Kitt Peak || Spacewatch || — || align=right data-sort-value="0.71" | 710 m || 
|-id=184 bgcolor=#d6d6d6
| 481184 ||  || — || October 28, 2005 || Kitt Peak || Spacewatch || — || align=right | 2.8 km || 
|-id=185 bgcolor=#d6d6d6
| 481185 ||  || — || October 29, 2005 || Kitt Peak || Spacewatch || — || align=right | 2.5 km || 
|-id=186 bgcolor=#d6d6d6
| 481186 ||  || — || October 29, 2005 || Mount Lemmon || Mount Lemmon Survey || — || align=right | 2.6 km || 
|-id=187 bgcolor=#fefefe
| 481187 ||  || — || October 25, 2005 || Catalina || CSS || critical || align=right data-sort-value="0.75" | 750 m || 
|-id=188 bgcolor=#d6d6d6
| 481188 ||  || — || October 31, 2005 || Kitt Peak || Spacewatch || EOS || align=right | 1.3 km || 
|-id=189 bgcolor=#d6d6d6
| 481189 ||  || — || October 22, 2005 || Kitt Peak || Spacewatch || — || align=right | 2.6 km || 
|-id=190 bgcolor=#fefefe
| 481190 ||  || — || October 29, 2005 || Catalina || CSS || — || align=right data-sort-value="0.82" | 820 m || 
|-id=191 bgcolor=#d6d6d6
| 481191 ||  || — || October 27, 2005 || Kitt Peak || Spacewatch || TIR || align=right | 2.5 km || 
|-id=192 bgcolor=#d6d6d6
| 481192 ||  || — || October 1, 2005 || Mount Lemmon || Mount Lemmon Survey || — || align=right | 2.7 km || 
|-id=193 bgcolor=#fefefe
| 481193 ||  || — || October 28, 2005 || Kitt Peak || Spacewatch || NYS || align=right data-sort-value="0.52" | 520 m || 
|-id=194 bgcolor=#fefefe
| 481194 ||  || — || October 28, 2005 || Kitt Peak || Spacewatch || — || align=right data-sort-value="0.58" | 580 m || 
|-id=195 bgcolor=#d6d6d6
| 481195 ||  || — || October 29, 2005 || Catalina || CSS || — || align=right | 2.7 km || 
|-id=196 bgcolor=#d6d6d6
| 481196 ||  || — || October 28, 2005 || Mount Lemmon || Mount Lemmon Survey || HYG || align=right | 1.9 km || 
|-id=197 bgcolor=#fefefe
| 481197 ||  || — || October 28, 2005 || Mount Lemmon || Mount Lemmon Survey || NYS || align=right data-sort-value="0.64" | 640 m || 
|-id=198 bgcolor=#fefefe
| 481198 ||  || — || October 30, 2005 || Kitt Peak || Spacewatch || NYS || align=right data-sort-value="0.52" | 520 m || 
|-id=199 bgcolor=#d6d6d6
| 481199 ||  || — || October 31, 2005 || Mount Lemmon || Mount Lemmon Survey || THM || align=right | 1.6 km || 
|-id=200 bgcolor=#fefefe
| 481200 ||  || — || July 30, 2005 || Siding Spring || SSS || — || align=right | 1.0 km || 
|}

481201–481300 

|-bgcolor=#fefefe
| 481201 ||  || — || October 22, 2005 || Catalina || CSS || NYS || align=right data-sort-value="0.66" | 660 m || 
|-id=202 bgcolor=#fefefe
| 481202 ||  || — || October 23, 2005 || Catalina || CSS || — || align=right data-sort-value="0.70" | 700 m || 
|-id=203 bgcolor=#fefefe
| 481203 ||  || — || September 30, 2005 || Mount Lemmon || Mount Lemmon Survey || — || align=right | 1.0 km || 
|-id=204 bgcolor=#d6d6d6
| 481204 ||  || — || October 22, 2005 || Apache Point || A. C. Becker || — || align=right | 3.9 km || 
|-id=205 bgcolor=#d6d6d6
| 481205 ||  || — || October 25, 2005 || Apache Point || A. C. Becker || EOS || align=right | 1.5 km || 
|-id=206 bgcolor=#fefefe
| 481206 ||  || — || October 28, 2005 || Kitt Peak || Spacewatch || — || align=right data-sort-value="0.63" | 630 m || 
|-id=207 bgcolor=#fefefe
| 481207 ||  || — || October 22, 2005 || Kitt Peak || Spacewatch || NYS || align=right data-sort-value="0.55" | 550 m || 
|-id=208 bgcolor=#fefefe
| 481208 ||  || — || October 30, 2005 || Socorro || LINEAR || H || align=right data-sort-value="0.54" | 540 m || 
|-id=209 bgcolor=#fefefe
| 481209 ||  || — || October 1, 2005 || Kitt Peak || Spacewatch || — || align=right data-sort-value="0.90" | 900 m || 
|-id=210 bgcolor=#fefefe
| 481210 ||  || — || October 25, 2005 || Mount Lemmon || Mount Lemmon Survey || — || align=right data-sort-value="0.84" | 840 m || 
|-id=211 bgcolor=#d6d6d6
| 481211 ||  || — || October 1, 2005 || Mount Lemmon || Mount Lemmon Survey || THM || align=right | 1.8 km || 
|-id=212 bgcolor=#d6d6d6
| 481212 ||  || — || November 4, 2005 || Kitt Peak || Spacewatch || EOS || align=right | 2.3 km || 
|-id=213 bgcolor=#d6d6d6
| 481213 ||  || — || November 3, 2005 || Socorro || LINEAR || — || align=right | 2.6 km || 
|-id=214 bgcolor=#d6d6d6
| 481214 ||  || — || October 28, 2005 || Catalina || CSS || — || align=right | 2.7 km || 
|-id=215 bgcolor=#fefefe
| 481215 ||  || — || April 21, 2004 || Kitt Peak || Spacewatch || — || align=right | 1.0 km || 
|-id=216 bgcolor=#fefefe
| 481216 ||  || — || November 1, 2005 || Mount Lemmon || Mount Lemmon Survey || — || align=right data-sort-value="0.84" | 840 m || 
|-id=217 bgcolor=#fefefe
| 481217 ||  || — || October 25, 2005 || Kitt Peak || Spacewatch || — || align=right data-sort-value="0.78" | 780 m || 
|-id=218 bgcolor=#fefefe
| 481218 ||  || — || November 2, 2005 || Mount Lemmon || Mount Lemmon Survey || — || align=right data-sort-value="0.85" | 850 m || 
|-id=219 bgcolor=#d6d6d6
| 481219 ||  || — || November 2, 2005 || Mount Lemmon || Mount Lemmon Survey || — || align=right | 2.5 km || 
|-id=220 bgcolor=#d6d6d6
| 481220 ||  || — || November 5, 2005 || Catalina || CSS || — || align=right | 2.4 km || 
|-id=221 bgcolor=#fefefe
| 481221 ||  || — || October 27, 2005 || Kitt Peak || Spacewatch || — || align=right data-sort-value="0.71" | 710 m || 
|-id=222 bgcolor=#fefefe
| 481222 ||  || — || November 2, 2005 || Mount Lemmon || Mount Lemmon Survey || — || align=right data-sort-value="0.71" | 710 m || 
|-id=223 bgcolor=#d6d6d6
| 481223 ||  || — || November 20, 2005 || Palomar || NEAT || — || align=right | 3.0 km || 
|-id=224 bgcolor=#d6d6d6
| 481224 ||  || — || November 22, 2005 || Kitt Peak || Spacewatch || TIR || align=right | 2.6 km || 
|-id=225 bgcolor=#d6d6d6
| 481225 ||  || — || November 21, 2005 || Kitt Peak || Spacewatch || — || align=right | 2.9 km || 
|-id=226 bgcolor=#fefefe
| 481226 ||  || — || November 21, 2005 || Kitt Peak || Spacewatch || — || align=right data-sort-value="0.75" | 750 m || 
|-id=227 bgcolor=#d6d6d6
| 481227 ||  || — || November 21, 2005 || Kitt Peak || Spacewatch || — || align=right | 4.6 km || 
|-id=228 bgcolor=#d6d6d6
| 481228 ||  || — || November 6, 2005 || Mount Lemmon || Mount Lemmon Survey || — || align=right | 2.4 km || 
|-id=229 bgcolor=#d6d6d6
| 481229 ||  || — || November 25, 2005 || Mount Lemmon || Mount Lemmon Survey || EMA || align=right | 2.7 km || 
|-id=230 bgcolor=#fefefe
| 481230 ||  || — || November 25, 2005 || Kitt Peak || Spacewatch || — || align=right data-sort-value="0.73" | 730 m || 
|-id=231 bgcolor=#d6d6d6
| 481231 ||  || — || November 28, 2005 || Junk Bond || D. Healy || — || align=right | 3.3 km || 
|-id=232 bgcolor=#fefefe
| 481232 ||  || — || November 22, 2005 || Kitt Peak || Spacewatch || — || align=right data-sort-value="0.64" | 640 m || 
|-id=233 bgcolor=#d6d6d6
| 481233 ||  || — || November 25, 2005 || Mount Lemmon || Mount Lemmon Survey || — || align=right | 2.2 km || 
|-id=234 bgcolor=#fefefe
| 481234 ||  || — || November 5, 2005 || Kitt Peak || Spacewatch || — || align=right data-sort-value="0.93" | 930 m || 
|-id=235 bgcolor=#fefefe
| 481235 ||  || — || November 28, 2005 || Mount Lemmon || Mount Lemmon Survey || — || align=right data-sort-value="0.62" | 620 m || 
|-id=236 bgcolor=#d6d6d6
| 481236 ||  || — || November 28, 2005 || Mount Lemmon || Mount Lemmon Survey || — || align=right | 3.5 km || 
|-id=237 bgcolor=#fefefe
| 481237 ||  || — || November 29, 2005 || Socorro || LINEAR || NYS || align=right data-sort-value="0.70" | 700 m || 
|-id=238 bgcolor=#fefefe
| 481238 ||  || — || November 28, 2005 || Catalina || CSS || H || align=right data-sort-value="0.97" | 970 m || 
|-id=239 bgcolor=#d6d6d6
| 481239 ||  || — || October 29, 2005 || Mount Lemmon || Mount Lemmon Survey || — || align=right | 2.9 km || 
|-id=240 bgcolor=#FA8072
| 481240 ||  || — || September 14, 2005 || Catalina || CSS || H || align=right data-sort-value="0.61" | 610 m || 
|-id=241 bgcolor=#d6d6d6
| 481241 ||  || — || October 26, 2005 || Kitt Peak || Spacewatch || THM || align=right | 1.8 km || 
|-id=242 bgcolor=#d6d6d6
| 481242 ||  || — || November 25, 2005 || Mount Lemmon || Mount Lemmon Survey || — || align=right | 2.8 km || 
|-id=243 bgcolor=#fefefe
| 481243 ||  || — || November 26, 2005 || Mount Lemmon || Mount Lemmon Survey || — || align=right | 1.5 km || 
|-id=244 bgcolor=#fefefe
| 481244 ||  || — || November 25, 2005 || Kitt Peak || Spacewatch || — || align=right data-sort-value="0.60" | 600 m || 
|-id=245 bgcolor=#fefefe
| 481245 ||  || — || November 25, 2005 || Kitt Peak || Spacewatch || — || align=right data-sort-value="0.53" | 530 m || 
|-id=246 bgcolor=#d6d6d6
| 481246 ||  || — || November 25, 2005 || Kitt Peak || Spacewatch || ELF || align=right | 2.6 km || 
|-id=247 bgcolor=#fefefe
| 481247 ||  || — || November 28, 2005 || Kitt Peak || Spacewatch || — || align=right data-sort-value="0.87" | 870 m || 
|-id=248 bgcolor=#d6d6d6
| 481248 ||  || — || October 25, 2005 || Catalina || CSS || — || align=right | 2.7 km || 
|-id=249 bgcolor=#d6d6d6
| 481249 ||  || — || November 29, 2005 || Kitt Peak || Spacewatch || LIX || align=right | 2.5 km || 
|-id=250 bgcolor=#fefefe
| 481250 ||  || — || November 25, 2005 || Kitt Peak || Spacewatch || V || align=right data-sort-value="0.69" | 690 m || 
|-id=251 bgcolor=#d6d6d6
| 481251 ||  || — || November 6, 2005 || Mount Lemmon || Mount Lemmon Survey || — || align=right | 3.3 km || 
|-id=252 bgcolor=#fefefe
| 481252 ||  || — || November 30, 2005 || Kitt Peak || Spacewatch || — || align=right data-sort-value="0.54" | 540 m || 
|-id=253 bgcolor=#fefefe
| 481253 ||  || — || November 6, 2005 || Kitt Peak || Spacewatch || — || align=right data-sort-value="0.62" | 620 m || 
|-id=254 bgcolor=#fefefe
| 481254 ||  || — || October 8, 2005 || Catalina || CSS || H || align=right data-sort-value="0.83" | 830 m || 
|-id=255 bgcolor=#d6d6d6
| 481255 ||  || — || November 25, 2005 || Catalina || CSS || — || align=right | 2.9 km || 
|-id=256 bgcolor=#d6d6d6
| 481256 ||  || — || November 28, 2005 || Catalina || CSS || — || align=right | 2.9 km || 
|-id=257 bgcolor=#d6d6d6
| 481257 ||  || — || November 25, 2005 || Catalina || CSS || — || align=right | 3.8 km || 
|-id=258 bgcolor=#d6d6d6
| 481258 ||  || — || November 30, 2005 || Mount Lemmon || Mount Lemmon Survey || — || align=right | 2.0 km || 
|-id=259 bgcolor=#fefefe
| 481259 ||  || — || November 28, 2005 || Socorro || LINEAR || — || align=right data-sort-value="0.90" | 900 m || 
|-id=260 bgcolor=#fefefe
| 481260 ||  || — || December 4, 2005 || Kitt Peak || Spacewatch || NYS || align=right data-sort-value="0.58" | 580 m || 
|-id=261 bgcolor=#fefefe
| 481261 ||  || — || December 2, 2005 || Kitt Peak || Spacewatch || NYS || align=right data-sort-value="0.55" | 550 m || 
|-id=262 bgcolor=#fefefe
| 481262 ||  || — || December 2, 2005 || Kitt Peak || Spacewatch || — || align=right data-sort-value="0.70" | 700 m || 
|-id=263 bgcolor=#d6d6d6
| 481263 ||  || — || November 28, 2005 || Socorro || LINEAR || — || align=right | 3.2 km || 
|-id=264 bgcolor=#fefefe
| 481264 ||  || — || December 5, 2005 || Mount Lemmon || Mount Lemmon Survey || NYS || align=right data-sort-value="0.49" | 490 m || 
|-id=265 bgcolor=#fefefe
| 481265 ||  || — || December 6, 2005 || Kitt Peak || Spacewatch || — || align=right data-sort-value="0.87" | 870 m || 
|-id=266 bgcolor=#d6d6d6
| 481266 ||  || — || December 6, 2005 || Kitt Peak || Spacewatch || — || align=right | 2.5 km || 
|-id=267 bgcolor=#d6d6d6
| 481267 ||  || — || December 7, 2005 || Kitt Peak || Spacewatch || — || align=right | 3.6 km || 
|-id=268 bgcolor=#d6d6d6
| 481268 ||  || — || December 10, 2005 || Kitt Peak || Spacewatch || VER || align=right | 2.3 km || 
|-id=269 bgcolor=#d6d6d6
| 481269 ||  || — || October 12, 2005 || Kitt Peak || Spacewatch || Tj (2.97) || align=right | 4.1 km || 
|-id=270 bgcolor=#d6d6d6
| 481270 ||  || — || November 29, 2005 || Kitt Peak || Spacewatch || EOS || align=right | 1.8 km || 
|-id=271 bgcolor=#d6d6d6
| 481271 ||  || — || November 26, 2005 || Kitt Peak || Spacewatch || — || align=right | 2.2 km || 
|-id=272 bgcolor=#fefefe
| 481272 ||  || — || December 23, 2005 || Kitt Peak || Spacewatch || NYS || align=right data-sort-value="0.58" | 580 m || 
|-id=273 bgcolor=#d6d6d6
| 481273 ||  || — || December 23, 2005 || Kitt Peak || Spacewatch || — || align=right | 2.2 km || 
|-id=274 bgcolor=#d6d6d6
| 481274 ||  || — || September 7, 2004 || Kitt Peak || Spacewatch || HYG || align=right | 2.5 km || 
|-id=275 bgcolor=#d6d6d6
| 481275 ||  || — || December 24, 2005 || Kitt Peak || Spacewatch || — || align=right | 4.3 km || 
|-id=276 bgcolor=#d6d6d6
| 481276 ||  || — || December 24, 2005 || Kitt Peak || Spacewatch || THM || align=right | 1.8 km || 
|-id=277 bgcolor=#fefefe
| 481277 ||  || — || December 22, 2005 || Kitt Peak || Spacewatch || NYS || align=right data-sort-value="0.57" | 570 m || 
|-id=278 bgcolor=#d6d6d6
| 481278 ||  || — || December 22, 2005 || Kitt Peak || Spacewatch || — || align=right | 2.9 km || 
|-id=279 bgcolor=#d6d6d6
| 481279 ||  || — || December 25, 2005 || Kitt Peak || Spacewatch || — || align=right | 3.3 km || 
|-id=280 bgcolor=#d6d6d6
| 481280 ||  || — || December 25, 2005 || Kitt Peak || Spacewatch || — || align=right | 3.7 km || 
|-id=281 bgcolor=#d6d6d6
| 481281 ||  || — || December 10, 2005 || Socorro || LINEAR || Tj (2.99) || align=right | 4.2 km || 
|-id=282 bgcolor=#d6d6d6
| 481282 ||  || — || December 22, 2005 || Kitt Peak || Spacewatch || — || align=right | 2.8 km || 
|-id=283 bgcolor=#fefefe
| 481283 ||  || — || December 2, 2005 || Mount Lemmon || Mount Lemmon Survey || NYS || align=right data-sort-value="0.57" | 570 m || 
|-id=284 bgcolor=#fefefe
| 481284 ||  || — || December 25, 2005 || Kitt Peak || Spacewatch || H || align=right data-sort-value="0.57" | 570 m || 
|-id=285 bgcolor=#fefefe
| 481285 ||  || — || December 24, 2005 || Kitt Peak || Spacewatch || — || align=right | 1.0 km || 
|-id=286 bgcolor=#fefefe
| 481286 ||  || — || December 24, 2005 || Kitt Peak || Spacewatch || — || align=right data-sort-value="0.61" | 610 m || 
|-id=287 bgcolor=#d6d6d6
| 481287 ||  || — || December 2, 2005 || Mount Lemmon || Mount Lemmon Survey || EOS || align=right | 2.0 km || 
|-id=288 bgcolor=#d6d6d6
| 481288 ||  || — || December 25, 2005 || Kitt Peak || Spacewatch || — || align=right | 3.3 km || 
|-id=289 bgcolor=#fefefe
| 481289 ||  || — || December 25, 2005 || Mount Lemmon || Mount Lemmon Survey || NYS || align=right data-sort-value="0.57" | 570 m || 
|-id=290 bgcolor=#fefefe
| 481290 ||  || — || December 26, 2005 || Mount Lemmon || Mount Lemmon Survey || — || align=right data-sort-value="0.76" | 760 m || 
|-id=291 bgcolor=#fefefe
| 481291 ||  || — || December 25, 2005 || Kitt Peak || Spacewatch || — || align=right data-sort-value="0.78" | 780 m || 
|-id=292 bgcolor=#d6d6d6
| 481292 ||  || — || December 27, 2005 || Socorro || LINEAR || — || align=right | 2.8 km || 
|-id=293 bgcolor=#d6d6d6
| 481293 ||  || — || December 26, 2005 || Kitt Peak || Spacewatch || — || align=right | 3.4 km || 
|-id=294 bgcolor=#d6d6d6
| 481294 ||  || — || December 25, 2005 || Kitt Peak || Spacewatch || — || align=right | 3.4 km || 
|-id=295 bgcolor=#fefefe
| 481295 ||  || — || December 29, 2005 || Catalina || CSS || — || align=right | 1.1 km || 
|-id=296 bgcolor=#d6d6d6
| 481296 ||  || — || December 27, 2005 || Kitt Peak || Spacewatch || — || align=right | 3.6 km || 
|-id=297 bgcolor=#d6d6d6
| 481297 ||  || — || December 24, 2005 || Kitt Peak || Spacewatch || TIR || align=right | 3.5 km || 
|-id=298 bgcolor=#d6d6d6
| 481298 ||  || — || November 30, 2005 || Mount Lemmon || Mount Lemmon Survey || — || align=right | 2.5 km || 
|-id=299 bgcolor=#fefefe
| 481299 ||  || — || December 30, 2005 || Catalina || CSS || — || align=right | 2.6 km || 
|-id=300 bgcolor=#d6d6d6
| 481300 ||  || — || November 21, 2005 || Kitt Peak || Spacewatch || — || align=right | 3.1 km || 
|}

481301–481400 

|-bgcolor=#d6d6d6
| 481301 ||  || — || December 30, 2005 || Mount Lemmon || Mount Lemmon Survey || LIX || align=right | 2.9 km || 
|-id=302 bgcolor=#d6d6d6
| 481302 ||  || — || December 7, 2005 || Kitt Peak || Spacewatch || — || align=right | 3.7 km || 
|-id=303 bgcolor=#d6d6d6
| 481303 ||  || — || December 2, 2005 || Kitt Peak || Spacewatch || — || align=right | 2.8 km || 
|-id=304 bgcolor=#d6d6d6
| 481304 ||  || — || December 23, 2005 || Kitt Peak || Spacewatch || — || align=right | 3.4 km || 
|-id=305 bgcolor=#d6d6d6
| 481305 ||  || — || November 4, 2005 || Kitt Peak || Spacewatch || — || align=right | 2.7 km || 
|-id=306 bgcolor=#d6d6d6
| 481306 ||  || — || December 25, 2005 || Mount Lemmon || Mount Lemmon Survey || — || align=right | 2.7 km || 
|-id=307 bgcolor=#d6d6d6
| 481307 ||  || — || December 30, 2005 || Mount Lemmon || Mount Lemmon Survey || — || align=right | 2.8 km || 
|-id=308 bgcolor=#d6d6d6
| 481308 ||  || — || December 31, 2005 || Kitt Peak || Spacewatch || — || align=right | 3.1 km || 
|-id=309 bgcolor=#d6d6d6
| 481309 ||  || — || December 26, 2005 || Mount Lemmon || Mount Lemmon Survey || — || align=right | 3.5 km || 
|-id=310 bgcolor=#d6d6d6
| 481310 ||  || — || December 30, 2005 || Kitt Peak || Spacewatch || — || align=right | 3.6 km || 
|-id=311 bgcolor=#d6d6d6
| 481311 ||  || — || January 2, 2006 || Catalina || CSS || — || align=right | 3.9 km || 
|-id=312 bgcolor=#d6d6d6
| 481312 ||  || — || January 5, 2006 || Mount Lemmon || Mount Lemmon Survey || — || align=right | 2.9 km || 
|-id=313 bgcolor=#fefefe
| 481313 ||  || — || January 5, 2006 || Kitt Peak || Spacewatch || — || align=right data-sort-value="0.81" | 810 m || 
|-id=314 bgcolor=#d6d6d6
| 481314 ||  || — || January 5, 2006 || Kitt Peak || Spacewatch || — || align=right | 2.0 km || 
|-id=315 bgcolor=#FA8072
| 481315 ||  || — || January 4, 2006 || Mount Lemmon || Mount Lemmon Survey || — || align=right data-sort-value="0.98" | 980 m || 
|-id=316 bgcolor=#d6d6d6
| 481316 ||  || — || January 4, 2006 || Kitt Peak || Spacewatch || — || align=right | 3.1 km || 
|-id=317 bgcolor=#fefefe
| 481317 ||  || — || January 4, 2006 || Kitt Peak || Spacewatch || — || align=right data-sort-value="0.78" | 780 m || 
|-id=318 bgcolor=#fefefe
| 481318 ||  || — || January 5, 2006 || Mount Lemmon || Mount Lemmon Survey || — || align=right | 1.7 km || 
|-id=319 bgcolor=#d6d6d6
| 481319 ||  || — || January 5, 2006 || Catalina || CSS || — || align=right | 3.8 km || 
|-id=320 bgcolor=#fefefe
| 481320 ||  || — || January 10, 2006 || Catalina || CSS || — || align=right | 1.2 km || 
|-id=321 bgcolor=#fefefe
| 481321 ||  || — || January 5, 2006 || Catalina || CSS || H || align=right data-sort-value="0.85" | 850 m || 
|-id=322 bgcolor=#fefefe
| 481322 ||  || — || January 19, 2006 || Gnosca || S. Sposetti || — || align=right data-sort-value="0.67" | 670 m || 
|-id=323 bgcolor=#fefefe
| 481323 ||  || — || January 20, 2006 || Kitt Peak || Spacewatch || — || align=right | 1.0 km || 
|-id=324 bgcolor=#d6d6d6
| 481324 ||  || — || December 22, 2005 || Kitt Peak || Spacewatch || — || align=right | 2.5 km || 
|-id=325 bgcolor=#fefefe
| 481325 ||  || — || January 10, 2006 || Mount Lemmon || Mount Lemmon Survey || NYS || align=right data-sort-value="0.46" | 460 m || 
|-id=326 bgcolor=#d6d6d6
| 481326 ||  || — || January 22, 2006 || Anderson Mesa || LONEOS || — || align=right | 3.0 km || 
|-id=327 bgcolor=#FFC2E0
| 481327 ||  || — || January 23, 2006 || Kitt Peak || Spacewatch || AMO || align=right data-sort-value="0.22" | 220 m || 
|-id=328 bgcolor=#d6d6d6
| 481328 ||  || — || January 23, 2006 || Mount Lemmon || Mount Lemmon Survey || — || align=right | 3.1 km || 
|-id=329 bgcolor=#fefefe
| 481329 ||  || — || January 25, 2006 || Kitt Peak || Spacewatch || — || align=right data-sort-value="0.67" | 670 m || 
|-id=330 bgcolor=#fefefe
| 481330 ||  || — || January 25, 2006 || Kitt Peak || Spacewatch || — || align=right data-sort-value="0.59" | 590 m || 
|-id=331 bgcolor=#d6d6d6
| 481331 ||  || — || January 23, 2006 || Kitt Peak || Spacewatch || — || align=right | 2.7 km || 
|-id=332 bgcolor=#d6d6d6
| 481332 ||  || — || January 23, 2006 || Kitt Peak || Spacewatch || — || align=right | 3.1 km || 
|-id=333 bgcolor=#d6d6d6
| 481333 ||  || — || January 25, 2006 || Kitt Peak || Spacewatch || — || align=right | 2.5 km || 
|-id=334 bgcolor=#d6d6d6
| 481334 ||  || — || January 26, 2006 || Kitt Peak || Spacewatch || — || align=right | 2.8 km || 
|-id=335 bgcolor=#fefefe
| 481335 ||  || — || January 7, 2006 || Mount Lemmon || Mount Lemmon Survey || — || align=right data-sort-value="0.61" | 610 m || 
|-id=336 bgcolor=#d6d6d6
| 481336 ||  || — || January 7, 2006 || Mount Lemmon || Mount Lemmon Survey || — || align=right | 2.2 km || 
|-id=337 bgcolor=#fefefe
| 481337 ||  || — || January 28, 2006 || Kitt Peak || Spacewatch || NYS || align=right data-sort-value="0.55" | 550 m || 
|-id=338 bgcolor=#d6d6d6
| 481338 ||  || — || January 27, 2006 || Mount Lemmon || Mount Lemmon Survey || — || align=right | 3.1 km || 
|-id=339 bgcolor=#fefefe
| 481339 ||  || — || January 30, 2006 || Kitt Peak || Spacewatch || NYS || align=right data-sort-value="0.57" | 570 m || 
|-id=340 bgcolor=#C2FFFF
| 481340 ||  || — || January 31, 2006 || Kitt Peak || Spacewatch || L5 || align=right | 10 km || 
|-id=341 bgcolor=#fefefe
| 481341 ||  || — || January 31, 2006 || Kitt Peak || Spacewatch || — || align=right | 1.5 km || 
|-id=342 bgcolor=#fefefe
| 481342 ||  || — || January 31, 2006 || Kitt Peak || Spacewatch || NYS || align=right data-sort-value="0.57" | 570 m || 
|-id=343 bgcolor=#d6d6d6
| 481343 ||  || — || January 6, 2006 || Mount Lemmon || Mount Lemmon Survey || — || align=right | 2.8 km || 
|-id=344 bgcolor=#E9E9E9
| 481344 ||  || — || February 1, 2006 || Kitt Peak || Spacewatch || — || align=right | 1.1 km || 
|-id=345 bgcolor=#d6d6d6
| 481345 ||  || — || January 6, 2006 || Mount Lemmon || Mount Lemmon Survey || — || align=right | 2.8 km || 
|-id=346 bgcolor=#fefefe
| 481346 ||  || — || January 10, 2006 || Mount Lemmon || Mount Lemmon Survey || — || align=right data-sort-value="0.65" | 650 m || 
|-id=347 bgcolor=#fefefe
| 481347 ||  || — || February 5, 2006 || Mount Lemmon || Mount Lemmon Survey || MAS || align=right data-sort-value="0.68" | 680 m || 
|-id=348 bgcolor=#d6d6d6
| 481348 ||  || — || February 1, 2006 || Mount Lemmon || Mount Lemmon Survey || — || align=right | 2.5 km || 
|-id=349 bgcolor=#fefefe
| 481349 ||  || — || February 21, 2006 || Mount Lemmon || Mount Lemmon Survey || — || align=right data-sort-value="0.67" | 670 m || 
|-id=350 bgcolor=#d6d6d6
| 481350 ||  || — || January 30, 2006 || Kitt Peak || Spacewatch || VER || align=right | 2.3 km || 
|-id=351 bgcolor=#fefefe
| 481351 ||  || — || February 22, 2006 || Anderson Mesa || LONEOS || — || align=right | 1.0 km || 
|-id=352 bgcolor=#fefefe
| 481352 ||  || — || January 28, 2006 || Anderson Mesa || LONEOS || — || align=right data-sort-value="0.84" | 840 m || 
|-id=353 bgcolor=#d6d6d6
| 481353 ||  || — || January 23, 2006 || Kitt Peak || Spacewatch || ELF || align=right | 3.1 km || 
|-id=354 bgcolor=#fefefe
| 481354 ||  || — || February 24, 2006 || Kitt Peak || Spacewatch || NYS || align=right data-sort-value="0.56" | 560 m || 
|-id=355 bgcolor=#fefefe
| 481355 ||  || — || February 24, 2006 || Kitt Peak || Spacewatch || — || align=right data-sort-value="0.53" | 530 m || 
|-id=356 bgcolor=#fefefe
| 481356 ||  || — || February 25, 2006 || Kitt Peak || Spacewatch || — || align=right data-sort-value="0.68" | 680 m || 
|-id=357 bgcolor=#fefefe
| 481357 ||  || — || March 3, 2006 || Kitt Peak || Spacewatch || NYS || align=right data-sort-value="0.60" | 600 m || 
|-id=358 bgcolor=#FA8072
| 481358 ||  || — || March 9, 2006 || Catalina || CSS || — || align=right | 1.1 km || 
|-id=359 bgcolor=#d6d6d6
| 481359 ||  || — || March 6, 2006 || Catalina || CSS || — || align=right | 4.8 km || 
|-id=360 bgcolor=#E9E9E9
| 481360 ||  || — || March 24, 2006 || Kitt Peak || Spacewatch || — || align=right | 1.5 km || 
|-id=361 bgcolor=#E9E9E9
| 481361 ||  || — || March 26, 2006 || Mount Lemmon || Mount Lemmon Survey || — || align=right | 1.0 km || 
|-id=362 bgcolor=#d6d6d6
| 481362 ||  || — || March 26, 2006 || Siding Spring || SSS || — || align=right | 3.5 km || 
|-id=363 bgcolor=#d6d6d6
| 481363 ||  || — || February 1, 2006 || Catalina || CSS || Tj (2.94) || align=right | 2.4 km || 
|-id=364 bgcolor=#fefefe
| 481364 ||  || — || April 18, 2006 || Kitt Peak || Spacewatch || — || align=right data-sort-value="0.96" | 960 m || 
|-id=365 bgcolor=#E9E9E9
| 481365 ||  || — || April 19, 2006 || Mount Lemmon || Mount Lemmon Survey || — || align=right | 1.3 km || 
|-id=366 bgcolor=#E9E9E9
| 481366 ||  || — || April 25, 2006 || Kitt Peak || Spacewatch || — || align=right | 1.7 km || 
|-id=367 bgcolor=#fefefe
| 481367 ||  || — || January 23, 2006 || Kitt Peak || Spacewatch || NYS || align=right data-sort-value="0.50" | 500 m || 
|-id=368 bgcolor=#d6d6d6
| 481368 ||  || — || April 26, 2006 || Cerro Tololo || M. W. Buie || — || align=right | 2.4 km || 
|-id=369 bgcolor=#fefefe
| 481369 ||  || — || April 27, 2006 || Cerro Tololo || M. W. Buie || — || align=right data-sort-value="0.83" | 830 m || 
|-id=370 bgcolor=#E9E9E9
| 481370 ||  || — || May 2, 2006 || Kitt Peak || Spacewatch || — || align=right | 1.7 km || 
|-id=371 bgcolor=#fefefe
| 481371 ||  || — || May 2, 2006 || Mount Lemmon || Mount Lemmon Survey || — || align=right data-sort-value="0.82" | 820 m || 
|-id=372 bgcolor=#fefefe
| 481372 ||  || — || April 25, 2006 || Mount Lemmon || Mount Lemmon Survey || — || align=right data-sort-value="0.87" | 870 m || 
|-id=373 bgcolor=#E9E9E9
| 481373 ||  || — || May 20, 2006 || Kitt Peak || Spacewatch || — || align=right | 1.9 km || 
|-id=374 bgcolor=#E9E9E9
| 481374 ||  || — || May 19, 2006 || Mount Lemmon || Mount Lemmon Survey || — || align=right | 1.7 km || 
|-id=375 bgcolor=#E9E9E9
| 481375 ||  || — || May 20, 2006 || Kitt Peak || Spacewatch || JUN || align=right | 1.1 km || 
|-id=376 bgcolor=#E9E9E9
| 481376 ||  || — || May 21, 2006 || Kitt Peak || Spacewatch || — || align=right | 1.5 km || 
|-id=377 bgcolor=#E9E9E9
| 481377 ||  || — || May 21, 2006 || Kitt Peak || Spacewatch || — || align=right | 2.1 km || 
|-id=378 bgcolor=#E9E9E9
| 481378 ||  || — || May 21, 2006 || Kitt Peak || Spacewatch || — || align=right data-sort-value="0.97" | 970 m || 
|-id=379 bgcolor=#E9E9E9
| 481379 ||  || — || May 27, 2006 || Kitt Peak || Spacewatch || — || align=right | 1.3 km || 
|-id=380 bgcolor=#E9E9E9
| 481380 ||  || — || June 19, 2006 || Mount Lemmon || Mount Lemmon Survey || — || align=right | 2.9 km || 
|-id=381 bgcolor=#FFC2E0
| 481381 ||  || — || July 22, 2006 || Palomar || NEAT || AMOcritical || align=right data-sort-value="0.78" | 780 m || 
|-id=382 bgcolor=#E9E9E9
| 481382 ||  || — || June 20, 2006 || Mount Lemmon || Mount Lemmon Survey || — || align=right | 2.2 km || 
|-id=383 bgcolor=#E9E9E9
| 481383 ||  || — || August 15, 2006 || Palomar || NEAT || — || align=right | 2.8 km || 
|-id=384 bgcolor=#E9E9E9
| 481384 ||  || — || July 21, 2006 || Catalina || CSS || — || align=right | 2.1 km || 
|-id=385 bgcolor=#FA8072
| 481385 ||  || — || August 18, 2006 || Kitt Peak || Spacewatch || — || align=right data-sort-value="0.71" | 710 m || 
|-id=386 bgcolor=#E9E9E9
| 481386 ||  || — || August 27, 2006 || Kitt Peak || Spacewatch || — || align=right | 2.0 km || 
|-id=387 bgcolor=#fefefe
| 481387 ||  || — || August 18, 2006 || Kitt Peak || Spacewatch || — || align=right data-sort-value="0.65" | 650 m || 
|-id=388 bgcolor=#fefefe
| 481388 ||  || — || September 6, 2006 || Wrightwood || J. W. Young || — || align=right | 1.2 km || 
|-id=389 bgcolor=#d6d6d6
| 481389 ||  || — || September 14, 2006 || Catalina || CSS || — || align=right | 1.9 km || 
|-id=390 bgcolor=#E9E9E9
| 481390 ||  || — || September 14, 2006 || Kitt Peak || Spacewatch || — || align=right | 1.6 km || 
|-id=391 bgcolor=#d6d6d6
| 481391 ||  || — || September 15, 2006 || Kitt Peak || Spacewatch || — || align=right | 1.8 km || 
|-id=392 bgcolor=#fefefe
| 481392 ||  || — || September 15, 2006 || Kitt Peak || Spacewatch || — || align=right data-sort-value="0.59" | 590 m || 
|-id=393 bgcolor=#E9E9E9
| 481393 ||  || — || September 15, 2006 || Kitt Peak || Spacewatch || AST || align=right | 1.5 km || 
|-id=394 bgcolor=#FFC2E0
| 481394 ||  || — || September 17, 2006 || Catalina || CSS || ATEPHA || align=right data-sort-value="0.37" | 370 m || 
|-id=395 bgcolor=#E9E9E9
| 481395 ||  || — || September 18, 2006 || Kitt Peak || Spacewatch || — || align=right | 1.7 km || 
|-id=396 bgcolor=#E9E9E9
| 481396 ||  || — || August 29, 2006 || Anderson Mesa || LONEOS || — || align=right | 2.7 km || 
|-id=397 bgcolor=#E9E9E9
| 481397 ||  || — || September 17, 2006 || Catalina || CSS || — || align=right | 2.1 km || 
|-id=398 bgcolor=#d6d6d6
| 481398 ||  || — || September 16, 2006 || Catalina || CSS || — || align=right | 1.6 km || 
|-id=399 bgcolor=#fefefe
| 481399 ||  || — || September 18, 2006 || Kitt Peak || Spacewatch || H || align=right data-sort-value="0.44" | 440 m || 
|-id=400 bgcolor=#d6d6d6
| 481400 ||  || — || September 15, 2006 || Kitt Peak || Spacewatch || — || align=right | 2.4 km || 
|}

481401–481500 

|-bgcolor=#E9E9E9
| 481401 ||  || — || September 14, 2006 || Kitt Peak || Spacewatch || — || align=right | 1.8 km || 
|-id=402 bgcolor=#fefefe
| 481402 ||  || — || September 25, 2006 || Kitt Peak || Spacewatch || — || align=right data-sort-value="0.54" | 540 m || 
|-id=403 bgcolor=#E9E9E9
| 481403 ||  || — || September 18, 2006 || Kitt Peak || Spacewatch || — || align=right | 1.7 km || 
|-id=404 bgcolor=#E9E9E9
| 481404 ||  || — || August 28, 2006 || Kitt Peak || Spacewatch || DOR || align=right | 1.6 km || 
|-id=405 bgcolor=#fefefe
| 481405 ||  || — || September 19, 2006 || Kitt Peak || Spacewatch || — || align=right data-sort-value="0.58" | 580 m || 
|-id=406 bgcolor=#E9E9E9
| 481406 ||  || — || September 16, 2006 || Siding Spring || SSS || — || align=right | 3.0 km || 
|-id=407 bgcolor=#d6d6d6
| 481407 ||  || — || September 17, 2006 || Kitt Peak || Spacewatch || — || align=right | 1.6 km || 
|-id=408 bgcolor=#d6d6d6
| 481408 ||  || — || September 17, 2006 || Kitt Peak || Spacewatch || — || align=right | 2.0 km || 
|-id=409 bgcolor=#E9E9E9
| 481409 ||  || — || September 18, 2006 || Kitt Peak || Spacewatch || — || align=right | 1.9 km || 
|-id=410 bgcolor=#E9E9E9
| 481410 ||  || — || September 27, 2006 || Mount Lemmon || Mount Lemmon Survey || — || align=right | 2.2 km || 
|-id=411 bgcolor=#fefefe
| 481411 ||  || — || October 4, 2006 || Mount Lemmon || Mount Lemmon Survey || — || align=right data-sort-value="0.78" | 780 m || 
|-id=412 bgcolor=#fefefe
| 481412 ||  || — || September 27, 2006 || Mount Lemmon || Mount Lemmon Survey || — || align=right data-sort-value="0.82" | 820 m || 
|-id=413 bgcolor=#fefefe
| 481413 ||  || — || October 12, 2006 || Kitt Peak || Spacewatch || — || align=right data-sort-value="0.71" | 710 m || 
|-id=414 bgcolor=#E9E9E9
| 481414 ||  || — || October 13, 2006 || Kitt Peak || Spacewatch || — || align=right | 1.8 km || 
|-id=415 bgcolor=#E9E9E9
| 481415 ||  || — || October 15, 2006 || Kitt Peak || Spacewatch || — || align=right | 2.4 km || 
|-id=416 bgcolor=#E9E9E9
| 481416 ||  || — || October 1, 2006 || Apache Point || A. C. Becker || — || align=right | 1.1 km || 
|-id=417 bgcolor=#fefefe
| 481417 ||  || — || September 25, 2006 || Kitt Peak || Spacewatch || — || align=right data-sort-value="0.52" | 520 m || 
|-id=418 bgcolor=#fefefe
| 481418 ||  || — || October 17, 2006 || Catalina || CSS || — || align=right data-sort-value="0.68" | 680 m || 
|-id=419 bgcolor=#fefefe
| 481419 ||  || — || September 20, 2006 || Anderson Mesa || LONEOS || — || align=right data-sort-value="0.62" | 620 m || 
|-id=420 bgcolor=#E9E9E9
| 481420 ||  || — || October 19, 2006 || Mount Lemmon || Mount Lemmon Survey || — || align=right | 1.8 km || 
|-id=421 bgcolor=#d6d6d6
| 481421 ||  || — || October 3, 2006 || Mount Lemmon || Mount Lemmon Survey || — || align=right | 1.7 km || 
|-id=422 bgcolor=#fefefe
| 481422 ||  || — || September 27, 2006 || Mount Lemmon || Mount Lemmon Survey || — || align=right data-sort-value="0.65" | 650 m || 
|-id=423 bgcolor=#E9E9E9
| 481423 ||  || — || October 3, 2006 || Mount Lemmon || Mount Lemmon Survey || AGN || align=right | 1.1 km || 
|-id=424 bgcolor=#d6d6d6
| 481424 ||  || — || September 28, 2006 || Mount Lemmon || Mount Lemmon Survey || KOR || align=right | 1.0 km || 
|-id=425 bgcolor=#d6d6d6
| 481425 ||  || — || October 19, 2006 || Kitt Peak || Spacewatch || KOR || align=right | 1.1 km || 
|-id=426 bgcolor=#fefefe
| 481426 ||  || — || October 19, 2006 || Kitt Peak || Spacewatch || — || align=right data-sort-value="0.68" | 680 m || 
|-id=427 bgcolor=#fefefe
| 481427 ||  || — || October 19, 2006 || Kitt Peak || Spacewatch || — || align=right data-sort-value="0.53" | 530 m || 
|-id=428 bgcolor=#fefefe
| 481428 ||  || — || September 26, 2006 || Kitt Peak || Spacewatch || — || align=right data-sort-value="0.71" | 710 m || 
|-id=429 bgcolor=#d6d6d6
| 481429 ||  || — || October 21, 2006 || Mount Lemmon || Mount Lemmon Survey || — || align=right | 2.0 km || 
|-id=430 bgcolor=#d6d6d6
| 481430 ||  || — || October 21, 2006 || Mount Lemmon || Mount Lemmon Survey || BRA || align=right | 1.1 km || 
|-id=431 bgcolor=#fefefe
| 481431 ||  || — || October 16, 2006 || Catalina || CSS || — || align=right data-sort-value="0.75" | 750 m || 
|-id=432 bgcolor=#d6d6d6
| 481432 ||  || — || October 19, 2006 || Catalina || CSS || — || align=right | 2.4 km || 
|-id=433 bgcolor=#d6d6d6
| 481433 ||  || — || September 27, 2006 || Mount Lemmon || Mount Lemmon Survey || EOS || align=right | 2.0 km || 
|-id=434 bgcolor=#E9E9E9
| 481434 ||  || — || October 16, 2006 || Kitt Peak || Spacewatch || — || align=right | 2.1 km || 
|-id=435 bgcolor=#fefefe
| 481435 ||  || — || September 30, 2006 || Mount Lemmon || Mount Lemmon Survey || (883) || align=right data-sort-value="0.65" | 650 m || 
|-id=436 bgcolor=#fefefe
| 481436 ||  || — || November 9, 2006 || Kitt Peak || Spacewatch || — || align=right data-sort-value="0.71" | 710 m || 
|-id=437 bgcolor=#E9E9E9
| 481437 ||  || — || November 1, 2006 || Kitt Peak || Spacewatch || — || align=right | 2.2 km || 
|-id=438 bgcolor=#fefefe
| 481438 ||  || — || November 11, 2006 || Kitt Peak || Spacewatch || — || align=right data-sort-value="0.65" | 650 m || 
|-id=439 bgcolor=#fefefe
| 481439 ||  || — || September 28, 2006 || Mount Lemmon || Mount Lemmon Survey || — || align=right data-sort-value="0.68" | 680 m || 
|-id=440 bgcolor=#fefefe
| 481440 ||  || — || November 11, 2006 || Mount Lemmon || Mount Lemmon Survey || — || align=right data-sort-value="0.75" | 750 m || 
|-id=441 bgcolor=#fefefe
| 481441 ||  || — || November 15, 2006 || Kitt Peak || Spacewatch || — || align=right data-sort-value="0.52" | 520 m || 
|-id=442 bgcolor=#FFC2E0
| 481442 ||  || — || November 20, 2006 || Catalina || CSS || ATE || align=right data-sort-value="0.17" | 170 m || 
|-id=443 bgcolor=#d6d6d6
| 481443 ||  || — || November 16, 2006 || Kitt Peak || Spacewatch || — || align=right | 1.9 km || 
|-id=444 bgcolor=#d6d6d6
| 481444 ||  || — || November 20, 2006 || Kitt Peak || Spacewatch || — || align=right | 2.4 km || 
|-id=445 bgcolor=#fefefe
| 481445 ||  || — || November 20, 2006 || Kitt Peak || Spacewatch || — || align=right data-sort-value="0.65" | 650 m || 
|-id=446 bgcolor=#d6d6d6
| 481446 ||  || — || October 21, 2006 || Mount Lemmon || Mount Lemmon Survey || — || align=right | 2.4 km || 
|-id=447 bgcolor=#fefefe
| 481447 ||  || — || November 23, 2006 || Kitt Peak || Spacewatch || — || align=right data-sort-value="0.59" | 590 m || 
|-id=448 bgcolor=#d6d6d6
| 481448 ||  || — || November 23, 2006 || Kitt Peak || Spacewatch || — || align=right | 1.3 km || 
|-id=449 bgcolor=#fefefe
| 481449 ||  || — || November 23, 2006 || Kitt Peak || Spacewatch || — || align=right data-sort-value="0.59" | 590 m || 
|-id=450 bgcolor=#fefefe
| 481450 ||  || — || November 16, 2006 || Kitt Peak || Spacewatch || — || align=right data-sort-value="0.62" | 620 m || 
|-id=451 bgcolor=#d6d6d6
| 481451 ||  || — || November 16, 2006 || Mount Lemmon || Mount Lemmon Survey || — || align=right | 2.7 km || 
|-id=452 bgcolor=#fefefe
| 481452 ||  || — || November 17, 2006 || Mount Lemmon || Mount Lemmon Survey || — || align=right data-sort-value="0.49" | 490 m || 
|-id=453 bgcolor=#d6d6d6
| 481453 ||  || — || November 21, 2006 || Mount Lemmon || Mount Lemmon Survey || EOS || align=right | 1.5 km || 
|-id=454 bgcolor=#fefefe
| 481454 ||  || — || November 22, 2006 || Mount Lemmon || Mount Lemmon Survey || — || align=right data-sort-value="0.86" | 860 m || 
|-id=455 bgcolor=#d6d6d6
| 481455 ||  || — || November 17, 2006 || Kitt Peak || Spacewatch || — || align=right | 2.7 km || 
|-id=456 bgcolor=#d6d6d6
| 481456 ||  || — || November 27, 2006 || Kitt Peak || Spacewatch || — || align=right | 1.8 km || 
|-id=457 bgcolor=#FFC2E0
| 481457 ||  || — || December 12, 2006 || Socorro || LINEAR || APOPHAcritical || align=right data-sort-value="0.22" | 220 m || 
|-id=458 bgcolor=#fefefe
| 481458 ||  || — || December 13, 2006 || Socorro || LINEAR || H || align=right data-sort-value="0.81" | 810 m || 
|-id=459 bgcolor=#fefefe
| 481459 ||  || — || November 22, 2006 || Mount Lemmon || Mount Lemmon Survey || — || align=right data-sort-value="0.79" | 790 m || 
|-id=460 bgcolor=#fefefe
| 481460 ||  || — || March 26, 2004 || Socorro || LINEAR || — || align=right data-sort-value="0.79" | 790 m || 
|-id=461 bgcolor=#d6d6d6
| 481461 ||  || — || October 23, 2006 || Mount Lemmon || Mount Lemmon Survey || AEG || align=right | 3.2 km || 
|-id=462 bgcolor=#fefefe
| 481462 ||  || — || December 12, 2006 || Catalina || CSS || — || align=right | 1.8 km || 
|-id=463 bgcolor=#fefefe
| 481463 ||  || — || December 13, 2006 || Kitt Peak || Spacewatch || (1338) || align=right data-sort-value="0.76" | 760 m || 
|-id=464 bgcolor=#d6d6d6
| 481464 ||  || — || November 25, 2006 || Kitt Peak || Spacewatch || — || align=right | 3.6 km || 
|-id=465 bgcolor=#d6d6d6
| 481465 ||  || — || November 25, 2006 || Mount Lemmon || Mount Lemmon Survey || — || align=right | 2.6 km || 
|-id=466 bgcolor=#fefefe
| 481466 ||  || — || December 21, 2006 || Kitt Peak || Spacewatch || — || align=right data-sort-value="0.49" | 490 m || 
|-id=467 bgcolor=#FA8072
| 481467 ||  || — || November 27, 2006 || Mount Lemmon || Mount Lemmon Survey || critical || align=right data-sort-value="0.59" | 590 m || 
|-id=468 bgcolor=#d6d6d6
| 481468 ||  || — || December 16, 2006 || Mount Lemmon || Mount Lemmon Survey || — || align=right | 2.6 km || 
|-id=469 bgcolor=#d6d6d6
| 481469 ||  || — || January 17, 2007 || Kitt Peak || Spacewatch || — || align=right | 2.5 km || 
|-id=470 bgcolor=#fefefe
| 481470 ||  || — || January 24, 2007 || Catalina || CSS || — || align=right data-sort-value="0.63" | 630 m || 
|-id=471 bgcolor=#fefefe
| 481471 ||  || — || January 24, 2007 || Nyukasa || Mount Nyukasa Stn. || — || align=right data-sort-value="0.62" | 620 m || 
|-id=472 bgcolor=#d6d6d6
| 481472 ||  || — || January 9, 2007 || Kitt Peak || Spacewatch || — || align=right | 1.8 km || 
|-id=473 bgcolor=#fefefe
| 481473 ||  || — || January 26, 2007 || Kitt Peak || Spacewatch || — || align=right data-sort-value="0.83" | 830 m || 
|-id=474 bgcolor=#d6d6d6
| 481474 ||  || — || January 26, 2007 || Kitt Peak || Spacewatch || — || align=right | 2.7 km || 
|-id=475 bgcolor=#fefefe
| 481475 ||  || — || January 17, 2007 || Kitt Peak || Spacewatch || H || align=right data-sort-value="0.58" | 580 m || 
|-id=476 bgcolor=#d6d6d6
| 481476 ||  || — || January 17, 2007 || Kitt Peak || Spacewatch || — || align=right | 2.2 km || 
|-id=477 bgcolor=#fefefe
| 481477 ||  || — || January 27, 2007 || Kitt Peak || Spacewatch || V || align=right data-sort-value="0.56" | 560 m || 
|-id=478 bgcolor=#d6d6d6
| 481478 ||  || — || January 27, 2007 || Mount Lemmon || Mount Lemmon Survey || — || align=right | 2.7 km || 
|-id=479 bgcolor=#d6d6d6
| 481479 ||  || — || December 12, 2006 || Mount Lemmon || Mount Lemmon Survey || — || align=right | 2.4 km || 
|-id=480 bgcolor=#d6d6d6
| 481480 ||  || — || December 21, 2006 || Mount Lemmon || Mount Lemmon Survey || — || align=right | 2.5 km || 
|-id=481 bgcolor=#fefefe
| 481481 ||  || — || February 8, 2007 || Mount Lemmon || Mount Lemmon Survey || NYS || align=right data-sort-value="0.46" | 460 m || 
|-id=482 bgcolor=#FFC2E0
| 481482 ||  || — || February 10, 2007 || Catalina || CSS || APO +1kmPHA || align=right | 1.1 km || 
|-id=483 bgcolor=#E9E9E9
| 481483 ||  || — || January 24, 2007 || Mount Lemmon || Mount Lemmon Survey || (5) || align=right data-sort-value="0.78" | 780 m || 
|-id=484 bgcolor=#d6d6d6
| 481484 ||  || — || January 17, 2007 || Kitt Peak || Spacewatch || critical || align=right | 2.0 km || 
|-id=485 bgcolor=#fefefe
| 481485 ||  || — || February 6, 2007 || Mount Lemmon || Mount Lemmon Survey || — || align=right data-sort-value="0.70" | 700 m || 
|-id=486 bgcolor=#fefefe
| 481486 ||  || — || January 17, 2007 || Catalina || CSS || H || align=right data-sort-value="0.80" | 800 m || 
|-id=487 bgcolor=#d6d6d6
| 481487 ||  || — || February 8, 2007 || Kitt Peak || Spacewatch || — || align=right | 1.8 km || 
|-id=488 bgcolor=#fefefe
| 481488 ||  || — || February 15, 2007 || Junk Bond || D. Healy || — || align=right data-sort-value="0.64" | 640 m || 
|-id=489 bgcolor=#fefefe
| 481489 ||  || — || November 22, 2006 || Mount Lemmon || Mount Lemmon Survey || — || align=right data-sort-value="0.87" | 870 m || 
|-id=490 bgcolor=#d6d6d6
| 481490 ||  || — || February 16, 2007 || Cordell-Lorenz || D. T. Durig || LIX || align=right | 3.3 km || 
|-id=491 bgcolor=#fefefe
| 481491 ||  || — || February 8, 2007 || Kitt Peak || Spacewatch || — || align=right data-sort-value="0.95" | 950 m || 
|-id=492 bgcolor=#fefefe
| 481492 ||  || — || February 17, 2007 || Kitt Peak || Spacewatch || — || align=right data-sort-value="0.67" | 670 m || 
|-id=493 bgcolor=#d6d6d6
| 481493 ||  || — || February 17, 2007 || Kitt Peak || Spacewatch || — || align=right | 2.6 km || 
|-id=494 bgcolor=#d6d6d6
| 481494 ||  || — || December 27, 2006 || Mount Lemmon || Mount Lemmon Survey || — || align=right | 3.3 km || 
|-id=495 bgcolor=#d6d6d6
| 481495 ||  || — || February 21, 2007 || Mount Lemmon || Mount Lemmon Survey || — || align=right | 3.3 km || 
|-id=496 bgcolor=#fefefe
| 481496 ||  || — || February 21, 2007 || Kitt Peak || Spacewatch || — || align=right data-sort-value="0.69" | 690 m || 
|-id=497 bgcolor=#d6d6d6
| 481497 ||  || — || November 6, 2005 || Kitt Peak || Spacewatch || — || align=right | 2.1 km || 
|-id=498 bgcolor=#d6d6d6
| 481498 ||  || — || January 28, 2007 || Kitt Peak || Spacewatch || — || align=right | 2.4 km || 
|-id=499 bgcolor=#d6d6d6
| 481499 ||  || — || February 23, 2007 || Mount Lemmon || Mount Lemmon Survey || — || align=right | 3.8 km || 
|-id=500 bgcolor=#d6d6d6
| 481500 ||  || — || February 25, 2007 || Mount Lemmon || Mount Lemmon Survey || — || align=right | 2.3 km || 
|}

481501–481600 

|-bgcolor=#fefefe
| 481501 ||  || — || March 10, 2007 || Mount Lemmon || Mount Lemmon Survey || — || align=right data-sort-value="0.63" | 630 m || 
|-id=502 bgcolor=#d6d6d6
| 481502 ||  || — || March 7, 2007 || Mount Lemmon || Mount Lemmon Survey || — || align=right | 2.4 km || 
|-id=503 bgcolor=#d6d6d6
| 481503 ||  || — || February 21, 2007 || Kitt Peak || Spacewatch || — || align=right | 2.6 km || 
|-id=504 bgcolor=#C2FFFF
| 481504 ||  || — || November 24, 2006 || Mount Lemmon || Mount Lemmon Survey || L5 || align=right | 13 km || 
|-id=505 bgcolor=#d6d6d6
| 481505 ||  || — || March 10, 2007 || Mount Lemmon || Mount Lemmon Survey || — || align=right | 2.5 km || 
|-id=506 bgcolor=#fefefe
| 481506 ||  || — || February 27, 2007 || Kitt Peak || Spacewatch || H || align=right data-sort-value="0.56" | 560 m || 
|-id=507 bgcolor=#d6d6d6
| 481507 ||  || — || March 10, 2007 || Mount Lemmon || Mount Lemmon Survey || — || align=right | 3.8 km || 
|-id=508 bgcolor=#d6d6d6
| 481508 ||  || — || February 22, 2007 || Siding Spring || SSS || — || align=right | 3.7 km || 
|-id=509 bgcolor=#d6d6d6
| 481509 ||  || — || March 12, 2007 || Kitt Peak || Spacewatch || — || align=right | 3.4 km || 
|-id=510 bgcolor=#fefefe
| 481510 ||  || — || March 14, 2007 || Kitt Peak || Spacewatch || — || align=right data-sort-value="0.70" | 700 m || 
|-id=511 bgcolor=#fefefe
| 481511 ||  || — || March 14, 2007 || Kitt Peak || Spacewatch || — || align=right data-sort-value="0.57" | 570 m || 
|-id=512 bgcolor=#fefefe
| 481512 ||  || — || March 14, 2007 || Kitt Peak || Spacewatch || — || align=right data-sort-value="0.76" | 760 m || 
|-id=513 bgcolor=#d6d6d6
| 481513 ||  || — || March 9, 2007 || Kitt Peak || Spacewatch || — || align=right | 2.7 km || 
|-id=514 bgcolor=#d6d6d6
| 481514 ||  || — || January 27, 2007 || Mount Lemmon || Mount Lemmon Survey || — || align=right | 2.6 km || 
|-id=515 bgcolor=#fefefe
| 481515 ||  || — || February 25, 2007 || Mount Lemmon || Mount Lemmon Survey || — || align=right data-sort-value="0.60" | 600 m || 
|-id=516 bgcolor=#fefefe
| 481516 ||  || — || February 15, 2007 || Catalina || CSS || — || align=right | 1.1 km || 
|-id=517 bgcolor=#d6d6d6
| 481517 ||  || — || March 15, 2007 || Kitt Peak || Spacewatch || — || align=right | 3.3 km || 
|-id=518 bgcolor=#d6d6d6
| 481518 ||  || — || March 17, 2007 || Anderson Mesa || LONEOS || — || align=right | 3.3 km || 
|-id=519 bgcolor=#d6d6d6
| 481519 ||  || — || March 16, 2007 || Mount Lemmon || Mount Lemmon Survey || EOS || align=right | 1.5 km || 
|-id=520 bgcolor=#d6d6d6
| 481520 ||  || — || February 9, 2007 || Kitt Peak || Spacewatch || — || align=right | 3.1 km || 
|-id=521 bgcolor=#d6d6d6
| 481521 ||  || — || March 26, 2007 || Kitt Peak || Spacewatch || — || align=right | 3.3 km || 
|-id=522 bgcolor=#d6d6d6
| 481522 ||  || — || March 20, 2007 || Catalina || CSS || — || align=right | 3.5 km || 
|-id=523 bgcolor=#d6d6d6
| 481523 ||  || — || April 14, 2007 || Kitt Peak || Spacewatch || HYG || align=right | 2.7 km || 
|-id=524 bgcolor=#d6d6d6
| 481524 ||  || — || March 26, 2007 || Kitt Peak || Spacewatch || — || align=right | 2.9 km || 
|-id=525 bgcolor=#d6d6d6
| 481525 ||  || — || April 20, 2007 || Kitt Peak || Spacewatch || — || align=right | 3.7 km || 
|-id=526 bgcolor=#d6d6d6
| 481526 ||  || — || March 16, 2007 || Kitt Peak || Spacewatch || — || align=right | 3.9 km || 
|-id=527 bgcolor=#d6d6d6
| 481527 ||  || — || April 20, 2007 || Kitt Peak || Spacewatch || — || align=right | 3.0 km || 
|-id=528 bgcolor=#d6d6d6
| 481528 ||  || — || April 24, 2007 || Mount Lemmon || Mount Lemmon Survey || — || align=right | 4.0 km || 
|-id=529 bgcolor=#fefefe
| 481529 ||  || — || April 25, 2007 || Mount Lemmon || Mount Lemmon Survey || V || align=right data-sort-value="0.76" | 760 m || 
|-id=530 bgcolor=#fefefe
| 481530 ||  || — || April 19, 2007 || Catalina || CSS || H || align=right data-sort-value="0.80" | 800 m || 
|-id=531 bgcolor=#d6d6d6
| 481531 ||  || — || May 8, 2007 || Catalina || CSS || Tj (2.98) || align=right | 3.7 km || 
|-id=532 bgcolor=#FFC2E0
| 481532 ||  || — || June 7, 2007 || Socorro || LINEAR || APOPHAmoon || align=right data-sort-value="0.42" | 420 m || 
|-id=533 bgcolor=#d6d6d6
| 481533 ||  || — || April 24, 2001 || Kitt Peak || Spacewatch || EOS || align=right | 2.1 km || 
|-id=534 bgcolor=#E9E9E9
| 481534 ||  || — || May 25, 2007 || Mount Lemmon || Mount Lemmon Survey || — || align=right data-sort-value="0.86" | 860 m || 
|-id=535 bgcolor=#E9E9E9
| 481535 ||  || — || June 21, 2007 || Kitt Peak || Spacewatch || — || align=right | 1.4 km || 
|-id=536 bgcolor=#C2FFFF
| 481536 ||  || — || June 21, 2007 || Mount Lemmon || Mount Lemmon Survey || L5 || align=right | 9.2 km || 
|-id=537 bgcolor=#E9E9E9
| 481537 ||  || — || July 10, 2007 || Siding Spring || SSS || — || align=right | 1.4 km || 
|-id=538 bgcolor=#fefefe
| 481538 ||  || — || July 23, 2007 || La Sagra || OAM Obs. || — || align=right | 1.5 km || 
|-id=539 bgcolor=#E9E9E9
| 481539 ||  || — || June 18, 2007 || Catalina || CSS || — || align=right | 1.4 km || 
|-id=540 bgcolor=#E9E9E9
| 481540 ||  || — || August 9, 2007 || Socorro || LINEAR || — || align=right | 1.7 km || 
|-id=541 bgcolor=#E9E9E9
| 481541 ||  || — || August 21, 2007 || Anderson Mesa || LONEOS || — || align=right | 1.1 km || 
|-id=542 bgcolor=#FFC2E0
| 481542 ||  || — || September 5, 2007 || Catalina || CSS || APO || align=right data-sort-value="0.74" | 740 m || 
|-id=543 bgcolor=#FFC2E0
| 481543 ||  || — || September 5, 2007 || Catalina || CSS || AMO || align=right data-sort-value="0.16" | 160 m || 
|-id=544 bgcolor=#E9E9E9
| 481544 ||  || — || September 5, 2007 || Catalina || CSS || — || align=right | 1.3 km || 
|-id=545 bgcolor=#E9E9E9
| 481545 ||  || — || September 10, 2007 || Catalina || CSS || — || align=right | 1.7 km || 
|-id=546 bgcolor=#E9E9E9
| 481546 ||  || — || August 13, 2007 || Socorro || LINEAR || — || align=right | 1.8 km || 
|-id=547 bgcolor=#E9E9E9
| 481547 ||  || — || September 14, 2007 || Socorro || LINEAR || — || align=right | 1.5 km || 
|-id=548 bgcolor=#E9E9E9
| 481548 ||  || — || September 12, 2007 || Catalina || CSS || — || align=right | 1.2 km || 
|-id=549 bgcolor=#E9E9E9
| 481549 ||  || — || September 10, 2007 || Mount Lemmon || Mount Lemmon Survey || MAR || align=right data-sort-value="0.76" | 760 m || 
|-id=550 bgcolor=#E9E9E9
| 481550 ||  || — || September 10, 2007 || Kitt Peak || Spacewatch || — || align=right | 1.2 km || 
|-id=551 bgcolor=#E9E9E9
| 481551 ||  || — || September 10, 2007 || Mount Lemmon || Mount Lemmon Survey || — || align=right | 1.3 km || 
|-id=552 bgcolor=#E9E9E9
| 481552 ||  || — || September 10, 2007 || Mount Lemmon || Mount Lemmon Survey || ADE || align=right | 1.8 km || 
|-id=553 bgcolor=#E9E9E9
| 481553 ||  || — || September 10, 2007 || Catalina || CSS || (1547) || align=right | 1.7 km || 
|-id=554 bgcolor=#E9E9E9
| 481554 ||  || — || September 12, 2007 || Kitt Peak || Spacewatch || — || align=right | 1.2 km || 
|-id=555 bgcolor=#E9E9E9
| 481555 ||  || — || September 11, 2007 || XuYi || PMO NEO || — || align=right | 1.5 km || 
|-id=556 bgcolor=#d6d6d6
| 481556 ||  || — || September 11, 2007 || XuYi || PMO NEO || criticalTj (2.92) || align=right | 3.9 km || 
|-id=557 bgcolor=#E9E9E9
| 481557 ||  || — || September 14, 2007 || Kitt Peak || Spacewatch || — || align=right | 1.2 km || 
|-id=558 bgcolor=#E9E9E9
| 481558 ||  || — || September 10, 2007 || Catalina || CSS || EUN || align=right | 1.3 km || 
|-id=559 bgcolor=#E9E9E9
| 481559 ||  || — || September 12, 2007 || Mount Lemmon || Mount Lemmon Survey || — || align=right | 1.3 km || 
|-id=560 bgcolor=#E9E9E9
| 481560 ||  || — || September 13, 2007 || Catalina || CSS || JUN || align=right data-sort-value="0.99" | 990 m || 
|-id=561 bgcolor=#E9E9E9
| 481561 ||  || — || September 5, 2007 || Anderson Mesa || LONEOS || — || align=right | 1.8 km || 
|-id=562 bgcolor=#E9E9E9
| 481562 ||  || — || September 12, 2007 || Catalina || CSS || MAR || align=right | 1.0 km || 
|-id=563 bgcolor=#E9E9E9
| 481563 ||  || — || September 12, 2007 || Catalina || CSS || EUN || align=right | 1.4 km || 
|-id=564 bgcolor=#E9E9E9
| 481564 ||  || — || September 14, 2007 || Mount Lemmon || Mount Lemmon Survey || GEF || align=right | 1.0 km || 
|-id=565 bgcolor=#E9E9E9
| 481565 ||  || — || September 11, 2007 || Catalina || CSS || — || align=right | 1.7 km || 
|-id=566 bgcolor=#E9E9E9
| 481566 ||  || — || September 17, 2007 || Bisei SG Center || BATTeRS || — || align=right | 1.5 km || 
|-id=567 bgcolor=#E9E9E9
| 481567 ||  || — || September 9, 2007 || Kitt Peak || Spacewatch || critical || align=right data-sort-value="0.75" | 750 m || 
|-id=568 bgcolor=#E9E9E9
| 481568 ||  || — || October 6, 2007 || Socorro || LINEAR || — || align=right | 1.9 km || 
|-id=569 bgcolor=#E9E9E9
| 481569 ||  || — || October 6, 2007 || Socorro || LINEAR || — || align=right | 2.0 km || 
|-id=570 bgcolor=#E9E9E9
| 481570 ||  || — || September 14, 2007 || Mount Lemmon || Mount Lemmon Survey || — || align=right | 1.1 km || 
|-id=571 bgcolor=#d6d6d6
| 481571 ||  || — || September 14, 2007 || Catalina || CSS || 3:2 || align=right | 4.5 km || 
|-id=572 bgcolor=#E9E9E9
| 481572 ||  || — || October 6, 2007 || Kitt Peak || Spacewatch || — || align=right | 2.8 km || 
|-id=573 bgcolor=#E9E9E9
| 481573 ||  || — || May 4, 2006 || Mount Lemmon || Mount Lemmon Survey || — || align=right | 1.5 km || 
|-id=574 bgcolor=#E9E9E9
| 481574 ||  || — || October 4, 2007 || Kitt Peak || Spacewatch || NEM || align=right | 1.9 km || 
|-id=575 bgcolor=#E9E9E9
| 481575 ||  || — || October 12, 2007 || Kitt Peak || Spacewatch || — || align=right | 1.6 km || 
|-id=576 bgcolor=#E9E9E9
| 481576 ||  || — || October 6, 2007 || Kitt Peak || Spacewatch || — || align=right | 2.2 km || 
|-id=577 bgcolor=#E9E9E9
| 481577 ||  || — || October 8, 2007 || Mount Lemmon || Mount Lemmon Survey || — || align=right | 2.1 km || 
|-id=578 bgcolor=#E9E9E9
| 481578 ||  || — || October 8, 2007 || Catalina || CSS || — || align=right | 1.9 km || 
|-id=579 bgcolor=#E9E9E9
| 481579 ||  || — || September 12, 2007 || Kitt Peak || Spacewatch || — || align=right | 1.6 km || 
|-id=580 bgcolor=#E9E9E9
| 481580 ||  || — || October 7, 2007 || Kitt Peak || Spacewatch || — || align=right | 1.5 km || 
|-id=581 bgcolor=#E9E9E9
| 481581 ||  || — || October 7, 2007 || Mount Lemmon || Mount Lemmon Survey || — || align=right | 1.3 km || 
|-id=582 bgcolor=#E9E9E9
| 481582 ||  || — || September 12, 2007 || Mount Lemmon || Mount Lemmon Survey || — || align=right | 1.1 km || 
|-id=583 bgcolor=#E9E9E9
| 481583 ||  || — || October 8, 2007 || Catalina || CSS || EUN || align=right | 1.2 km || 
|-id=584 bgcolor=#E9E9E9
| 481584 ||  || — || October 4, 2007 || Kitt Peak || Spacewatch || — || align=right | 1.3 km || 
|-id=585 bgcolor=#E9E9E9
| 481585 ||  || — || September 11, 2007 || Catalina || CSS || — || align=right | 2.4 km || 
|-id=586 bgcolor=#E9E9E9
| 481586 ||  || — || October 9, 2007 || Socorro || LINEAR || — || align=right | 1.7 km || 
|-id=587 bgcolor=#E9E9E9
| 481587 ||  || — || September 8, 2007 || Catalina || CSS || JUN || align=right | 1.1 km || 
|-id=588 bgcolor=#E9E9E9
| 481588 ||  || — || October 7, 2007 || Mount Lemmon || Mount Lemmon Survey || — || align=right | 1.1 km || 
|-id=589 bgcolor=#fefefe
| 481589 ||  || — || October 11, 2007 || Socorro || LINEAR || — || align=right data-sort-value="0.92" | 920 m || 
|-id=590 bgcolor=#E9E9E9
| 481590 ||  || — || September 25, 2007 || Mount Lemmon || Mount Lemmon Survey || fast? || align=right | 2.1 km || 
|-id=591 bgcolor=#E9E9E9
| 481591 ||  || — || October 8, 2007 || Kitt Peak || Spacewatch || — || align=right | 1.9 km || 
|-id=592 bgcolor=#E9E9E9
| 481592 ||  || — || October 9, 2007 || Mount Lemmon || Mount Lemmon Survey || (5) || align=right data-sort-value="0.69" | 690 m || 
|-id=593 bgcolor=#E9E9E9
| 481593 ||  || — || September 12, 2007 || Catalina || CSS || — || align=right | 1.5 km || 
|-id=594 bgcolor=#E9E9E9
| 481594 ||  || — || September 18, 2007 || Mount Lemmon || Mount Lemmon Survey || — || align=right | 2.3 km || 
|-id=595 bgcolor=#E9E9E9
| 481595 ||  || — || October 8, 2007 || Kitt Peak || Spacewatch || — || align=right | 1.2 km || 
|-id=596 bgcolor=#E9E9E9
| 481596 ||  || — || October 9, 2007 || Mount Lemmon || Mount Lemmon Survey || — || align=right | 1.3 km || 
|-id=597 bgcolor=#E9E9E9
| 481597 ||  || — || October 8, 2007 || Catalina || CSS || — || align=right | 1.6 km || 
|-id=598 bgcolor=#E9E9E9
| 481598 ||  || — || October 10, 2007 || Kitt Peak || Spacewatch || — || align=right | 2.5 km || 
|-id=599 bgcolor=#E9E9E9
| 481599 ||  || — || October 10, 2007 || Kitt Peak || Spacewatch || — || align=right | 1.9 km || 
|-id=600 bgcolor=#E9E9E9
| 481600 ||  || — || October 11, 2007 || Mount Lemmon || Mount Lemmon Survey || — || align=right | 1.4 km || 
|}

481601–481700 

|-bgcolor=#E9E9E9
| 481601 ||  || — || September 10, 2007 || Mount Lemmon || Mount Lemmon Survey || — || align=right | 1.3 km || 
|-id=602 bgcolor=#E9E9E9
| 481602 ||  || — || October 11, 2007 || Kitt Peak || Spacewatch || — || align=right | 1.8 km || 
|-id=603 bgcolor=#E9E9E9
| 481603 ||  || — || October 13, 2007 || Kitt Peak || Spacewatch || — || align=right | 1.3 km || 
|-id=604 bgcolor=#E9E9E9
| 481604 ||  || — || October 6, 2007 || Kitt Peak || Spacewatch || — || align=right | 1.8 km || 
|-id=605 bgcolor=#E9E9E9
| 481605 ||  || — || October 15, 2007 || Mount Lemmon || Mount Lemmon Survey || — || align=right | 1.8 km || 
|-id=606 bgcolor=#E9E9E9
| 481606 ||  || — || October 13, 2007 || Kitt Peak || Spacewatch || fast? || align=right | 2.7 km || 
|-id=607 bgcolor=#E9E9E9
| 481607 ||  || — || October 10, 2007 || Anderson Mesa || LONEOS || — || align=right | 1.7 km || 
|-id=608 bgcolor=#E9E9E9
| 481608 ||  || — || October 8, 2007 || Catalina || CSS || — || align=right | 1.7 km || 
|-id=609 bgcolor=#E9E9E9
| 481609 ||  || — || October 12, 2007 || Catalina || CSS || — || align=right | 1.3 km || 
|-id=610 bgcolor=#E9E9E9
| 481610 ||  || — || October 8, 2007 || Anderson Mesa || LONEOS || — || align=right | 2.6 km || 
|-id=611 bgcolor=#E9E9E9
| 481611 ||  || — || October 8, 2007 || Kitt Peak || Spacewatch || — || align=right | 1.8 km || 
|-id=612 bgcolor=#E9E9E9
| 481612 ||  || — || October 13, 2007 || Socorro || LINEAR || JUN || align=right | 1.0 km || 
|-id=613 bgcolor=#E9E9E9
| 481613 ||  || — || October 9, 2007 || Catalina || CSS || — || align=right | 1.8 km || 
|-id=614 bgcolor=#E9E9E9
| 481614 ||  || — || October 8, 2007 || Catalina || CSS || — || align=right | 2.4 km || 
|-id=615 bgcolor=#E9E9E9
| 481615 ||  || — || October 10, 2007 || Mount Lemmon || Mount Lemmon Survey || — || align=right | 1.2 km || 
|-id=616 bgcolor=#E9E9E9
| 481616 ||  || — || September 25, 2007 || Mount Lemmon || Mount Lemmon Survey || — || align=right | 1.7 km || 
|-id=617 bgcolor=#E9E9E9
| 481617 ||  || — || October 8, 2007 || Kitt Peak || Spacewatch || — || align=right | 1.6 km || 
|-id=618 bgcolor=#E9E9E9
| 481618 ||  || — || October 19, 2007 || Catalina || CSS || — || align=right | 1.3 km || 
|-id=619 bgcolor=#E9E9E9
| 481619 ||  || — || October 16, 2007 || Mount Lemmon || Mount Lemmon Survey || MRX || align=right data-sort-value="0.87" | 870 m || 
|-id=620 bgcolor=#E9E9E9
| 481620 ||  || — || October 29, 2007 || Siding Spring || SSS || — || align=right | 1.9 km || 
|-id=621 bgcolor=#E9E9E9
| 481621 ||  || — || October 12, 2007 || Kitt Peak || Spacewatch || — || align=right | 1.5 km || 
|-id=622 bgcolor=#E9E9E9
| 481622 ||  || — || October 30, 2007 || Kitt Peak || Spacewatch || — || align=right | 2.2 km || 
|-id=623 bgcolor=#E9E9E9
| 481623 ||  || — || October 8, 2007 || Kitt Peak || Spacewatch || — || align=right | 1.3 km || 
|-id=624 bgcolor=#E9E9E9
| 481624 ||  || — || October 12, 2007 || Kitt Peak || Spacewatch || — || align=right | 1.2 km || 
|-id=625 bgcolor=#E9E9E9
| 481625 ||  || — || October 31, 2007 || Mount Lemmon || Mount Lemmon Survey || — || align=right | 1.2 km || 
|-id=626 bgcolor=#E9E9E9
| 481626 ||  || — || November 15, 1998 || Kitt Peak || Spacewatch || AGN || align=right | 1.4 km || 
|-id=627 bgcolor=#E9E9E9
| 481627 ||  || — || October 8, 2007 || Kitt Peak || Spacewatch || EUN || align=right | 1.0 km || 
|-id=628 bgcolor=#E9E9E9
| 481628 ||  || — || October 10, 2007 || Catalina || CSS || — || align=right | 1.9 km || 
|-id=629 bgcolor=#E9E9E9
| 481629 ||  || — || October 20, 2007 || Mount Lemmon || Mount Lemmon Survey || — || align=right | 1.8 km || 
|-id=630 bgcolor=#E9E9E9
| 481630 ||  || — || October 19, 2007 || Catalina || CSS || — || align=right | 1.1 km || 
|-id=631 bgcolor=#E9E9E9
| 481631 ||  || — || October 30, 2007 || Kitt Peak || Spacewatch || — || align=right | 1.7 km || 
|-id=632 bgcolor=#E9E9E9
| 481632 ||  || — || September 11, 2007 || Catalina || CSS || — || align=right | 1.8 km || 
|-id=633 bgcolor=#E9E9E9
| 481633 ||  || — || October 21, 2007 || Catalina || CSS || — || align=right | 2.3 km || 
|-id=634 bgcolor=#E9E9E9
| 481634 ||  || — || October 19, 2007 || Kitt Peak || Spacewatch || — || align=right | 1.5 km || 
|-id=635 bgcolor=#E9E9E9
| 481635 ||  || — || October 21, 2007 || Catalina || CSS || EUN || align=right | 1.5 km || 
|-id=636 bgcolor=#E9E9E9
| 481636 ||  || — || November 1, 2007 || Kitt Peak || Spacewatch || — || align=right | 1.8 km || 
|-id=637 bgcolor=#E9E9E9
| 481637 ||  || — || October 16, 2007 || Kitt Peak || Spacewatch || — || align=right | 1.1 km || 
|-id=638 bgcolor=#E9E9E9
| 481638 ||  || — || November 4, 2007 || Mount Lemmon || Mount Lemmon Survey || — || align=right | 2.2 km || 
|-id=639 bgcolor=#E9E9E9
| 481639 ||  || — || October 8, 2007 || Catalina || CSS || EUN || align=right | 1.2 km || 
|-id=640 bgcolor=#E9E9E9
| 481640 ||  || — || October 12, 2007 || Socorro || LINEAR || — || align=right | 1.8 km || 
|-id=641 bgcolor=#E9E9E9
| 481641 ||  || — || November 1, 2007 || Kitt Peak || Spacewatch || — || align=right | 1.3 km || 
|-id=642 bgcolor=#E9E9E9
| 481642 ||  || — || November 3, 2007 || Kitt Peak || Spacewatch || — || align=right | 1.7 km || 
|-id=643 bgcolor=#E9E9E9
| 481643 ||  || — || September 15, 2007 || Mount Lemmon || Mount Lemmon Survey || — || align=right | 1.9 km || 
|-id=644 bgcolor=#E9E9E9
| 481644 ||  || — || October 21, 2007 || Mount Lemmon || Mount Lemmon Survey || — || align=right | 1.5 km || 
|-id=645 bgcolor=#E9E9E9
| 481645 ||  || — || November 3, 2007 || Mount Lemmon || Mount Lemmon Survey || — || align=right | 2.2 km || 
|-id=646 bgcolor=#E9E9E9
| 481646 ||  || — || October 20, 2007 || Mount Lemmon || Mount Lemmon Survey || AEO || align=right data-sort-value="0.96" | 960 m || 
|-id=647 bgcolor=#E9E9E9
| 481647 ||  || — || November 4, 2007 || Kitt Peak || Spacewatch || — || align=right | 2.1 km || 
|-id=648 bgcolor=#E9E9E9
| 481648 ||  || — || November 5, 2007 || Kitt Peak || Spacewatch || — || align=right | 1.1 km || 
|-id=649 bgcolor=#fefefe
| 481649 ||  || — || November 5, 2007 || Kitt Peak || Spacewatch || — || align=right data-sort-value="0.65" | 650 m || 
|-id=650 bgcolor=#E9E9E9
| 481650 ||  || — || November 5, 2007 || Kitt Peak || Spacewatch || — || align=right | 2.0 km || 
|-id=651 bgcolor=#E9E9E9
| 481651 ||  || — || November 4, 2007 || Mount Lemmon || Mount Lemmon Survey || — || align=right | 1.4 km || 
|-id=652 bgcolor=#E9E9E9
| 481652 ||  || — || October 11, 2007 || Kitt Peak || Spacewatch || — || align=right | 1.1 km || 
|-id=653 bgcolor=#E9E9E9
| 481653 ||  || — || November 4, 2007 || Mount Lemmon || Mount Lemmon Survey || — || align=right | 2.8 km || 
|-id=654 bgcolor=#E9E9E9
| 481654 ||  || — || October 15, 2007 || Kitt Peak || Spacewatch || — || align=right | 1.7 km || 
|-id=655 bgcolor=#E9E9E9
| 481655 ||  || — || November 7, 2007 || Kitt Peak || Spacewatch || — || align=right | 2.1 km || 
|-id=656 bgcolor=#E9E9E9
| 481656 ||  || — || November 8, 2007 || Kitt Peak || Spacewatch || (1547) || align=right | 1.8 km || 
|-id=657 bgcolor=#E9E9E9
| 481657 ||  || — || November 9, 2007 || Catalina || CSS || — || align=right | 1.7 km || 
|-id=658 bgcolor=#E9E9E9
| 481658 ||  || — || October 15, 2007 || Mount Lemmon || Mount Lemmon Survey || — || align=right | 1.3 km || 
|-id=659 bgcolor=#E9E9E9
| 481659 ||  || — || November 13, 2007 || Kitt Peak || Spacewatch || — || align=right | 1.3 km || 
|-id=660 bgcolor=#E9E9E9
| 481660 ||  || — || November 11, 2007 || Mount Lemmon || Mount Lemmon Survey || RAF || align=right data-sort-value="0.78" | 780 m || 
|-id=661 bgcolor=#E9E9E9
| 481661 ||  || — || November 2, 2007 || Kitt Peak || Spacewatch || — || align=right | 1.7 km || 
|-id=662 bgcolor=#E9E9E9
| 481662 ||  || — || October 20, 2007 || Mount Lemmon || Mount Lemmon Survey || — || align=right | 2.0 km || 
|-id=663 bgcolor=#E9E9E9
| 481663 ||  || — || November 14, 2007 || Socorro || LINEAR || — || align=right | 1.3 km || 
|-id=664 bgcolor=#E9E9E9
| 481664 ||  || — || September 13, 2007 || Catalina || CSS || — || align=right | 1.4 km || 
|-id=665 bgcolor=#E9E9E9
| 481665 ||  || — || October 11, 2007 || Anderson Mesa || LONEOS || — || align=right | 1.6 km || 
|-id=666 bgcolor=#E9E9E9
| 481666 ||  || — || November 7, 2007 || Mount Lemmon || Mount Lemmon Survey || — || align=right | 1.8 km || 
|-id=667 bgcolor=#E9E9E9
| 481667 ||  || — || November 6, 2007 || Kitt Peak || Spacewatch || — || align=right | 1.8 km || 
|-id=668 bgcolor=#E9E9E9
| 481668 ||  || — || November 3, 2007 || Mount Lemmon || Mount Lemmon Survey || — || align=right | 2.4 km || 
|-id=669 bgcolor=#E9E9E9
| 481669 ||  || — || November 12, 2007 || Mount Lemmon || Mount Lemmon Survey || — || align=right | 1.7 km || 
|-id=670 bgcolor=#E9E9E9
| 481670 ||  || — || November 2, 2007 || Kitt Peak || Spacewatch || — || align=right data-sort-value="0.97" | 970 m || 
|-id=671 bgcolor=#E9E9E9
| 481671 ||  || — || November 8, 2007 || Socorro || LINEAR || EUN || align=right | 1.1 km || 
|-id=672 bgcolor=#E9E9E9
| 481672 ||  || — || November 17, 2007 || Catalina || CSS || — || align=right | 1.8 km || 
|-id=673 bgcolor=#E9E9E9
| 481673 ||  || — || September 10, 2007 || Mount Lemmon || Mount Lemmon Survey || EUN || align=right data-sort-value="0.92" | 920 m || 
|-id=674 bgcolor=#E9E9E9
| 481674 ||  || — || November 18, 2007 || Kitt Peak || Spacewatch || — || align=right | 1.4 km || 
|-id=675 bgcolor=#E9E9E9
| 481675 ||  || — || December 3, 2007 || Socorro || LINEAR || — || align=right | 2.7 km || 
|-id=676 bgcolor=#E9E9E9
| 481676 ||  || — || December 20, 2007 || Catalina || CSS || — || align=right | 4.0 km || 
|-id=677 bgcolor=#E9E9E9
| 481677 ||  || — || December 4, 2007 || Kitt Peak || Spacewatch || — || align=right | 1.8 km || 
|-id=678 bgcolor=#E9E9E9
| 481678 ||  || — || October 15, 2007 || Kitt Peak || Spacewatch || JUN || align=right | 1.00 km || 
|-id=679 bgcolor=#E9E9E9
| 481679 ||  || — || November 5, 2007 || Mount Lemmon || Mount Lemmon Survey || — || align=right | 1.9 km || 
|-id=680 bgcolor=#E9E9E9
| 481680 ||  || — || December 4, 2007 || Mount Lemmon || Mount Lemmon Survey || GEF || align=right | 1.3 km || 
|-id=681 bgcolor=#E9E9E9
| 481681 ||  || — || December 18, 2007 || Mount Lemmon || Mount Lemmon Survey || — || align=right | 2.8 km || 
|-id=682 bgcolor=#E9E9E9
| 481682 ||  || — || December 30, 2007 || Catalina || CSS || — || align=right | 2.5 km || 
|-id=683 bgcolor=#E9E9E9
| 481683 ||  || — || December 30, 2007 || Kitt Peak || Spacewatch || — || align=right | 2.0 km || 
|-id=684 bgcolor=#E9E9E9
| 481684 ||  || — || December 5, 2007 || Mount Lemmon || Mount Lemmon Survey || — || align=right | 2.0 km || 
|-id=685 bgcolor=#E9E9E9
| 481685 ||  || — || January 10, 2008 || Kitt Peak || Spacewatch || — || align=right | 1.5 km || 
|-id=686 bgcolor=#fefefe
| 481686 ||  || — || December 30, 2007 || Mount Lemmon || Mount Lemmon Survey || — || align=right data-sort-value="0.62" | 620 m || 
|-id=687 bgcolor=#E9E9E9
| 481687 ||  || — || January 10, 2008 || Mount Lemmon || Mount Lemmon Survey ||  || align=right | 1.8 km || 
|-id=688 bgcolor=#fefefe
| 481688 ||  || — || January 10, 2008 || Mount Lemmon || Mount Lemmon Survey || — || align=right data-sort-value="0.75" | 750 m || 
|-id=689 bgcolor=#E9E9E9
| 481689 ||  || — || December 14, 2007 || Mount Lemmon || Mount Lemmon Survey || — || align=right | 2.5 km || 
|-id=690 bgcolor=#E9E9E9
| 481690 ||  || — || November 19, 2007 || Mount Lemmon || Mount Lemmon Survey || — || align=right | 2.0 km || 
|-id=691 bgcolor=#E9E9E9
| 481691 ||  || — || January 11, 2008 || Kitt Peak || Spacewatch || — || align=right | 1.8 km || 
|-id=692 bgcolor=#E9E9E9
| 481692 ||  || — || December 30, 2007 || Mount Lemmon || Mount Lemmon Survey || — || align=right | 2.1 km || 
|-id=693 bgcolor=#E9E9E9
| 481693 ||  || — || December 30, 2007 || Kitt Peak || Spacewatch || — || align=right | 1.7 km || 
|-id=694 bgcolor=#E9E9E9
| 481694 ||  || — || January 12, 2008 || Kitt Peak || Spacewatch || — || align=right | 2.7 km || 
|-id=695 bgcolor=#E9E9E9
| 481695 ||  || — || January 15, 2008 || Kitt Peak || Spacewatch || — || align=right | 2.0 km || 
|-id=696 bgcolor=#E9E9E9
| 481696 ||  || — || January 1, 2008 || Kitt Peak || Spacewatch || — || align=right | 2.4 km || 
|-id=697 bgcolor=#E9E9E9
| 481697 ||  || — || January 13, 2008 || Mount Lemmon || Mount Lemmon Survey || — || align=right | 2.6 km || 
|-id=698 bgcolor=#E9E9E9
| 481698 ||  || — || January 16, 2008 || Kitt Peak || Spacewatch || — || align=right | 1.8 km || 
|-id=699 bgcolor=#d6d6d6
| 481699 ||  || — || January 11, 2008 || Kitt Peak || Spacewatch || — || align=right | 2.2 km || 
|-id=700 bgcolor=#E9E9E9
| 481700 ||  || — || January 30, 2008 || Kitt Peak || Spacewatch || — || align=right | 2.2 km || 
|}

481701–481800 

|-bgcolor=#E9E9E9
| 481701 ||  || — || December 31, 2007 || Socorro || LINEAR || — || align=right | 2.0 km || 
|-id=702 bgcolor=#E9E9E9
| 481702 ||  || — || February 2, 2008 || Mount Lemmon || Mount Lemmon Survey || — || align=right | 1.8 km || 
|-id=703 bgcolor=#E9E9E9
| 481703 ||  || — || February 3, 2008 || Kitt Peak || Spacewatch || — || align=right | 1.7 km || 
|-id=704 bgcolor=#E9E9E9
| 481704 ||  || — || February 2, 2008 || Kitt Peak || Spacewatch || — || align=right | 2.2 km || 
|-id=705 bgcolor=#d6d6d6
| 481705 ||  || — || February 2, 2008 || Kitt Peak || Spacewatch || — || align=right | 2.0 km || 
|-id=706 bgcolor=#d6d6d6
| 481706 ||  || — || February 2, 2008 || Kitt Peak || Spacewatch || — || align=right | 2.0 km || 
|-id=707 bgcolor=#fefefe
| 481707 ||  || — || February 7, 2008 || Mount Lemmon || Mount Lemmon Survey || — || align=right data-sort-value="0.57" | 570 m || 
|-id=708 bgcolor=#E9E9E9
| 481708 ||  || — || February 8, 2008 || Kitt Peak || Spacewatch || — || align=right | 1.9 km || 
|-id=709 bgcolor=#E9E9E9
| 481709 ||  || — || February 2, 2008 || Kitt Peak || Spacewatch || GEF || align=right | 1.1 km || 
|-id=710 bgcolor=#E9E9E9
| 481710 ||  || — || January 18, 2008 || Mount Lemmon || Mount Lemmon Survey || — || align=right | 1.9 km || 
|-id=711 bgcolor=#E9E9E9
| 481711 ||  || — || December 5, 2007 || Mount Lemmon || Mount Lemmon Survey || — || align=right | 2.1 km || 
|-id=712 bgcolor=#fefefe
| 481712 ||  || — || February 2, 2008 || Kitt Peak || Spacewatch || — || align=right data-sort-value="0.59" | 590 m || 
|-id=713 bgcolor=#fefefe
| 481713 ||  || — || February 3, 2008 || Kitt Peak || Spacewatch || — || align=right data-sort-value="0.62" | 620 m || 
|-id=714 bgcolor=#E9E9E9
| 481714 ||  || — || January 30, 2008 || Mount Lemmon || Mount Lemmon Survey || — || align=right | 1.9 km || 
|-id=715 bgcolor=#E9E9E9
| 481715 ||  || — || March 1, 2008 || Kitt Peak || Spacewatch || — || align=right | 2.2 km || 
|-id=716 bgcolor=#d6d6d6
| 481716 ||  || — || March 5, 2008 || Mount Lemmon || Mount Lemmon Survey || — || align=right | 1.9 km || 
|-id=717 bgcolor=#E9E9E9
| 481717 ||  || — || February 18, 2008 || Mount Lemmon || Mount Lemmon Survey || — || align=right | 2.0 km || 
|-id=718 bgcolor=#E9E9E9
| 481718 ||  || — || February 12, 2008 || Kitt Peak || Spacewatch || DOR || align=right | 1.8 km || 
|-id=719 bgcolor=#fefefe
| 481719 ||  || — || March 7, 2008 || Catalina || CSS || — || align=right data-sort-value="0.75" | 750 m || 
|-id=720 bgcolor=#E9E9E9
| 481720 ||  || — || January 13, 2008 || Kitt Peak || Spacewatch || — || align=right | 2.7 km || 
|-id=721 bgcolor=#d6d6d6
| 481721 ||  || — || March 8, 2008 || Kitt Peak || Spacewatch || — || align=right | 2.5 km || 
|-id=722 bgcolor=#d6d6d6
| 481722 ||  || — || March 1, 2008 || Kitt Peak || Spacewatch || — || align=right | 2.1 km || 
|-id=723 bgcolor=#d6d6d6
| 481723 ||  || — || March 8, 2008 || Mount Lemmon || Mount Lemmon Survey || — || align=right | 2.5 km || 
|-id=724 bgcolor=#d6d6d6
| 481724 ||  || — || March 10, 2008 || Kitt Peak || Spacewatch || — || align=right | 1.9 km || 
|-id=725 bgcolor=#d6d6d6
| 481725 ||  || — || March 12, 2008 || Mount Lemmon || Mount Lemmon Survey || — || align=right | 3.3 km || 
|-id=726 bgcolor=#d6d6d6
| 481726 ||  || — || March 10, 2008 || Mount Lemmon || Mount Lemmon Survey || EOS || align=right | 1.9 km || 
|-id=727 bgcolor=#fefefe
| 481727 ||  || — || March 27, 2008 || Kitt Peak || Spacewatch || — || align=right data-sort-value="0.79" | 790 m || 
|-id=728 bgcolor=#d6d6d6
| 481728 ||  || — || March 27, 2008 || Kitt Peak || Spacewatch || — || align=right | 3.9 km || 
|-id=729 bgcolor=#d6d6d6
| 481729 ||  || — || March 28, 2008 || Kitt Peak || Spacewatch || — || align=right | 3.1 km || 
|-id=730 bgcolor=#d6d6d6
| 481730 ||  || — || March 30, 2008 || Kitt Peak || Spacewatch || — || align=right | 2.3 km || 
|-id=731 bgcolor=#d6d6d6
| 481731 ||  || — || March 30, 2008 || Kitt Peak || Spacewatch || VER || align=right | 4.0 km || 
|-id=732 bgcolor=#d6d6d6
| 481732 ||  || — || March 31, 2008 || Kitt Peak || Spacewatch || — || align=right | 2.3 km || 
|-id=733 bgcolor=#E9E9E9
| 481733 ||  || — || April 6, 2008 || Mount Lemmon || Mount Lemmon Survey || — || align=right | 2.5 km || 
|-id=734 bgcolor=#d6d6d6
| 481734 ||  || — || October 31, 2005 || Catalina || CSS || EOS || align=right | 2.7 km || 
|-id=735 bgcolor=#d6d6d6
| 481735 ||  || — || March 14, 2008 || Socorro || LINEAR || Tj (2.95) || align=right | 4.2 km || 
|-id=736 bgcolor=#E9E9E9
| 481736 ||  || — || March 8, 2008 || Kitt Peak || Spacewatch || DOR || align=right | 1.9 km || 
|-id=737 bgcolor=#fefefe
| 481737 ||  || — || February 29, 2008 || Kitt Peak || Spacewatch || — || align=right data-sort-value="0.60" | 600 m || 
|-id=738 bgcolor=#d6d6d6
| 481738 ||  || — || April 1, 2008 || Mount Lemmon || Mount Lemmon Survey || EOS || align=right | 1.8 km || 
|-id=739 bgcolor=#d6d6d6
| 481739 ||  || — || April 5, 2008 || Mount Lemmon || Mount Lemmon Survey || — || align=right | 2.2 km || 
|-id=740 bgcolor=#d6d6d6
| 481740 ||  || — || January 24, 2007 || Mount Lemmon || Mount Lemmon Survey || — || align=right | 2.5 km || 
|-id=741 bgcolor=#d6d6d6
| 481741 ||  || — || April 11, 2008 || Kitt Peak || Spacewatch || — || align=right | 4.6 km || 
|-id=742 bgcolor=#d6d6d6
| 481742 ||  || — || April 11, 2008 || Kitt Peak || Spacewatch || — || align=right | 2.9 km || 
|-id=743 bgcolor=#fefefe
| 481743 ||  || — || April 12, 2008 || Kitt Peak || Spacewatch || — || align=right data-sort-value="0.74" | 740 m || 
|-id=744 bgcolor=#C2FFFF
| 481744 ||  || — || April 14, 2008 || Mount Lemmon || Mount Lemmon Survey || L5 || align=right | 8.0 km || 
|-id=745 bgcolor=#d6d6d6
| 481745 ||  || — || April 6, 2008 || Kitt Peak || Spacewatch || EOS || align=right | 1.9 km || 
|-id=746 bgcolor=#d6d6d6
| 481746 ||  || — || April 14, 2008 || Mount Lemmon || Mount Lemmon Survey || — || align=right | 3.1 km || 
|-id=747 bgcolor=#C2FFFF
| 481747 ||  || — || April 6, 2008 || Kitt Peak || Spacewatch || L5 || align=right | 8.7 km || 
|-id=748 bgcolor=#d6d6d6
| 481748 ||  || — || April 3, 2008 || Kitt Peak || Spacewatch || TEL || align=right | 1.2 km || 
|-id=749 bgcolor=#d6d6d6
| 481749 ||  || — || April 6, 2008 || Kitt Peak || Spacewatch || — || align=right | 3.1 km || 
|-id=750 bgcolor=#d6d6d6
| 481750 ||  || — || April 27, 2008 || Kitt Peak || Spacewatch || — || align=right | 3.1 km || 
|-id=751 bgcolor=#d6d6d6
| 481751 ||  || — || October 31, 2005 || Mount Lemmon || Mount Lemmon Survey || — || align=right | 3.8 km || 
|-id=752 bgcolor=#d6d6d6
| 481752 ||  || — || April 6, 2008 || Mount Lemmon || Mount Lemmon Survey || EOS || align=right | 2.1 km || 
|-id=753 bgcolor=#d6d6d6
| 481753 ||  || — || April 30, 2008 || Kitt Peak || Spacewatch || EOS || align=right | 1.8 km || 
|-id=754 bgcolor=#d6d6d6
| 481754 ||  || — || April 17, 2008 || Mount Lemmon || Mount Lemmon Survey || — || align=right | 4.3 km || 
|-id=755 bgcolor=#FA8072
| 481755 ||  || — || April 3, 2008 || Kitt Peak || Spacewatch || — || align=right data-sort-value="0.58" | 580 m || 
|-id=756 bgcolor=#d6d6d6
| 481756 ||  || — || December 27, 2005 || Mount Lemmon || Mount Lemmon Survey || — || align=right | 3.1 km || 
|-id=757 bgcolor=#fefefe
| 481757 ||  || — || May 3, 2008 || Mount Lemmon || Mount Lemmon Survey || — || align=right | 1.0 km || 
|-id=758 bgcolor=#d6d6d6
| 481758 ||  || — || March 28, 2008 || Mount Lemmon || Mount Lemmon Survey || — || align=right | 2.9 km || 
|-id=759 bgcolor=#d6d6d6
| 481759 ||  || — || May 6, 2008 || Mount Lemmon || Mount Lemmon Survey || — || align=right | 4.2 km || 
|-id=760 bgcolor=#d6d6d6
| 481760 ||  || — || May 28, 2008 || Kitt Peak || Spacewatch || — || align=right | 3.4 km || 
|-id=761 bgcolor=#fefefe
| 481761 ||  || — || May 5, 2008 || Mount Lemmon || Mount Lemmon Survey || — || align=right data-sort-value="0.64" | 640 m || 
|-id=762 bgcolor=#d6d6d6
| 481762 ||  || — || June 7, 2008 || Kitt Peak || Spacewatch || — || align=right | 2.5 km || 
|-id=763 bgcolor=#fefefe
| 481763 ||  || — || June 22, 2008 || Kitt Peak || Spacewatch || — || align=right data-sort-value="0.75" | 750 m || 
|-id=764 bgcolor=#d6d6d6
| 481764 ||  || — || June 3, 2008 || Kitt Peak || Spacewatch || VER || align=right | 2.8 km || 
|-id=765 bgcolor=#FA8072
| 481765 ||  || — || May 29, 2008 || Mount Lemmon || Mount Lemmon Survey || — || align=right data-sort-value="0.97" | 970 m || 
|-id=766 bgcolor=#fefefe
| 481766 ||  || — || August 7, 2008 || Dauban || F. Kugel || — || align=right data-sort-value="0.91" | 910 m || 
|-id=767 bgcolor=#fefefe
| 481767 ||  || — || August 7, 2008 || Kitt Peak || Spacewatch || MAScritical || align=right data-sort-value="0.71" | 710 m || 
|-id=768 bgcolor=#fefefe
| 481768 ||  || — || August 7, 2008 || Kitt Peak || Spacewatch || NYS || align=right data-sort-value="0.63" | 630 m || 
|-id=769 bgcolor=#fefefe
| 481769 ||  || — || September 2, 2008 || Kitt Peak || Spacewatch || — || align=right data-sort-value="0.69" | 690 m || 
|-id=770 bgcolor=#fefefe
| 481770 ||  || — || August 22, 2008 || Kitt Peak || Spacewatch || — || align=right data-sort-value="0.78" | 780 m || 
|-id=771 bgcolor=#fefefe
| 481771 ||  || — || September 6, 2008 || Catalina || CSS || — || align=right data-sort-value="0.84" | 840 m || 
|-id=772 bgcolor=#fefefe
| 481772 ||  || — || September 5, 2008 || Kitt Peak || Spacewatch || V || align=right data-sort-value="0.72" | 720 m || 
|-id=773 bgcolor=#FA8072
| 481773 ||  || — || September 22, 2008 || Socorro || LINEAR || — || align=right | 1.0 km || 
|-id=774 bgcolor=#fefefe
| 481774 ||  || — || September 22, 2008 || Socorro || LINEAR || — || align=right | 1.1 km || 
|-id=775 bgcolor=#FFC2E0
| 481775 ||  || — || September 21, 2008 || Siding Spring || SSS || AMOcritical || align=right data-sort-value="0.74" | 740 m || 
|-id=776 bgcolor=#fefefe
| 481776 ||  || — || September 20, 2008 || Kitt Peak || Spacewatch || — || align=right | 1.0 km || 
|-id=777 bgcolor=#fefefe
| 481777 ||  || — || September 21, 2008 || Kitt Peak || Spacewatch || — || align=right data-sort-value="0.75" | 750 m || 
|-id=778 bgcolor=#fefefe
| 481778 ||  || — || September 21, 2008 || Kitt Peak || Spacewatch || — || align=right data-sort-value="0.94" | 940 m || 
|-id=779 bgcolor=#fefefe
| 481779 ||  || — || September 22, 2008 || Kitt Peak || Spacewatch || — || align=right data-sort-value="0.56" | 560 m || 
|-id=780 bgcolor=#fefefe
| 481780 ||  || — || September 22, 2008 || Kitt Peak || Spacewatch || — || align=right data-sort-value="0.79" | 790 m || 
|-id=781 bgcolor=#fefefe
| 481781 ||  || — || September 22, 2008 || Kitt Peak || Spacewatch || — || align=right data-sort-value="0.81" | 810 m || 
|-id=782 bgcolor=#fefefe
| 481782 ||  || — || September 23, 2008 || Mount Lemmon || Mount Lemmon Survey || — || align=right data-sort-value="0.89" | 890 m || 
|-id=783 bgcolor=#fefefe
| 481783 ||  || — || September 28, 2008 || Socorro || LINEAR || MAS || align=right data-sort-value="0.77" | 770 m || 
|-id=784 bgcolor=#fefefe
| 481784 ||  || — || September 22, 2008 || Kitt Peak || Spacewatch || — || align=right data-sort-value="0.79" | 790 m || 
|-id=785 bgcolor=#E9E9E9
| 481785 ||  || — || September 25, 2008 || Kitt Peak || Spacewatch || critical || align=right data-sort-value="0.59" | 590 m || 
|-id=786 bgcolor=#fefefe
| 481786 ||  || — || September 21, 2008 || Kitt Peak || Spacewatch || — || align=right data-sort-value="0.82" | 820 m || 
|-id=787 bgcolor=#fefefe
| 481787 ||  || — || September 20, 2008 || Catalina || CSS || H || align=right data-sort-value="0.58" | 580 m || 
|-id=788 bgcolor=#E9E9E9
| 481788 ||  || — || September 22, 2008 || Kitt Peak || Spacewatch || — || align=right data-sort-value="0.74" | 740 m || 
|-id=789 bgcolor=#fefefe
| 481789 ||  || — || September 24, 2008 || Kitt Peak || Spacewatch || — || align=right data-sort-value="0.75" | 750 m || 
|-id=790 bgcolor=#FFC2E0
| 481790 ||  || — || October 6, 2008 || Catalina || CSS || AMO || align=right data-sort-value="0.49" | 490 m || 
|-id=791 bgcolor=#d6d6d6
| 481791 ||  || — || October 1, 2008 || Mount Lemmon || Mount Lemmon Survey || 3:2 || align=right | 4.7 km || 
|-id=792 bgcolor=#FA8072
| 481792 ||  || — || October 8, 2008 || Socorro || LINEAR || H || align=right data-sort-value="0.77" | 770 m || 
|-id=793 bgcolor=#fefefe
| 481793 ||  || — || September 2, 2008 || Kitt Peak || Spacewatch || NYS || align=right data-sort-value="0.70" | 700 m || 
|-id=794 bgcolor=#fefefe
| 481794 ||  || — || October 1, 2008 || Mount Lemmon || Mount Lemmon Survey || — || align=right data-sort-value="0.98" | 980 m || 
|-id=795 bgcolor=#fefefe
| 481795 ||  || — || September 22, 2008 || Mount Lemmon || Mount Lemmon Survey || — || align=right data-sort-value="0.71" | 710 m || 
|-id=796 bgcolor=#fefefe
| 481796 ||  || — || October 2, 2008 || Kitt Peak || Spacewatch || NYS || align=right data-sort-value="0.69" | 690 m || 
|-id=797 bgcolor=#fefefe
| 481797 ||  || — || October 2, 2008 || Kitt Peak || Spacewatch || — || align=right data-sort-value="0.72" | 720 m || 
|-id=798 bgcolor=#fefefe
| 481798 ||  || — || October 2, 2008 || Kitt Peak || Spacewatch || MAS || align=right data-sort-value="0.65" | 650 m || 
|-id=799 bgcolor=#E9E9E9
| 481799 ||  || — || September 29, 2008 || Kitt Peak || Spacewatch || critical || align=right data-sort-value="0.75" | 750 m || 
|-id=800 bgcolor=#fefefe
| 481800 ||  || — || September 23, 2008 || Kitt Peak || Spacewatch || MAS || align=right data-sort-value="0.79" | 790 m || 
|}

481801–481900 

|-bgcolor=#fefefe
| 481801 ||  || — || January 4, 2006 || Mount Lemmon || Mount Lemmon Survey || V || align=right data-sort-value="0.72" | 720 m || 
|-id=802 bgcolor=#fefefe
| 481802 ||  || — || September 22, 2008 || Kitt Peak || Spacewatch || — || align=right data-sort-value="0.76" | 760 m || 
|-id=803 bgcolor=#fefefe
| 481803 ||  || — || October 6, 2008 || Mount Lemmon || Mount Lemmon Survey || — || align=right data-sort-value="0.76" | 760 m || 
|-id=804 bgcolor=#E9E9E9
| 481804 ||  || — || October 6, 2008 || Catalina || CSS || — || align=right data-sort-value="0.91" | 910 m || 
|-id=805 bgcolor=#fefefe
| 481805 ||  || — || October 8, 2008 || Kitt Peak || Spacewatch || NYS || align=right data-sort-value="0.61" | 610 m || 
|-id=806 bgcolor=#fefefe
| 481806 ||  || — || October 8, 2008 || Kitt Peak || Spacewatch || MAS || align=right data-sort-value="0.68" | 680 m || 
|-id=807 bgcolor=#d6d6d6
| 481807 ||  || — || October 1, 2008 || Kitt Peak || Spacewatch || 3:2 || align=right | 4.2 km || 
|-id=808 bgcolor=#fefefe
| 481808 ||  || — || October 1, 2008 || Kitt Peak || Spacewatch || — || align=right data-sort-value="0.50" | 500 m || 
|-id=809 bgcolor=#fefefe
| 481809 ||  || — || October 1, 2008 || Kitt Peak || Spacewatch || critical || align=right data-sort-value="0.75" | 750 m || 
|-id=810 bgcolor=#E9E9E9
| 481810 ||  || — || October 3, 2008 || Mount Lemmon || Mount Lemmon Survey || — || align=right data-sort-value="0.82" | 820 m || 
|-id=811 bgcolor=#E9E9E9
| 481811 ||  || — || October 20, 2008 || Kitt Peak || Spacewatch || — || align=right data-sort-value="0.82" | 820 m || 
|-id=812 bgcolor=#fefefe
| 481812 ||  || — || October 20, 2008 || Kitt Peak || Spacewatch || — || align=right | 1.0 km || 
|-id=813 bgcolor=#fefefe
| 481813 ||  || — || September 29, 2008 || Mount Lemmon || Mount Lemmon Survey || H || align=right data-sort-value="0.81" | 810 m || 
|-id=814 bgcolor=#fefefe
| 481814 ||  || — || September 29, 2008 || Kitt Peak || Spacewatch || — || align=right data-sort-value="0.70" | 700 m || 
|-id=815 bgcolor=#fefefe
| 481815 ||  || — || September 7, 2008 || Mount Lemmon || Mount Lemmon Survey || critical || align=right data-sort-value="0.94" | 940 m || 
|-id=816 bgcolor=#E9E9E9
| 481816 ||  || — || October 21, 2008 || Kitt Peak || Spacewatch || — || align=right | 1.2 km || 
|-id=817 bgcolor=#FFC2E0
| 481817 ||  || — || October 26, 2008 || Mount Lemmon || Mount Lemmon Survey || ATIPHA || align=right data-sort-value="0.67" | 670 m || 
|-id=818 bgcolor=#fefefe
| 481818 ||  || — || October 22, 2008 || Kitt Peak || Spacewatch || — || align=right data-sort-value="0.88" | 880 m || 
|-id=819 bgcolor=#fefefe
| 481819 ||  || — || September 28, 2008 || Mount Lemmon || Mount Lemmon Survey || — || align=right data-sort-value="0.97" | 970 m || 
|-id=820 bgcolor=#fefefe
| 481820 ||  || — || September 29, 2008 || Mount Lemmon || Mount Lemmon Survey || — || align=right | 1.1 km || 
|-id=821 bgcolor=#d6d6d6
| 481821 ||  || — || October 24, 2008 || Kitt Peak || Spacewatch || 3:2 || align=right | 3.7 km || 
|-id=822 bgcolor=#fefefe
| 481822 ||  || — || October 24, 2008 || Kitt Peak || Spacewatch || H || align=right data-sort-value="0.72" | 720 m || 
|-id=823 bgcolor=#fefefe
| 481823 ||  || — || October 26, 2008 || Kitt Peak || Spacewatch || NYS || align=right data-sort-value="0.78" | 780 m || 
|-id=824 bgcolor=#fefefe
| 481824 ||  || — || October 25, 2008 || Kitt Peak || Spacewatch || — || align=right data-sort-value="0.78" | 780 m || 
|-id=825 bgcolor=#E9E9E9
| 481825 ||  || — || September 23, 2008 || Kitt Peak || Spacewatch || critical || align=right data-sort-value="0.45" | 450 m || 
|-id=826 bgcolor=#fefefe
| 481826 ||  || — || October 27, 2008 || Kitt Peak || Spacewatch || — || align=right data-sort-value="0.78" | 780 m || 
|-id=827 bgcolor=#fefefe
| 481827 ||  || — || October 29, 2008 || Kitt Peak || Spacewatch || H || align=right data-sort-value="0.74" | 740 m || 
|-id=828 bgcolor=#E9E9E9
| 481828 ||  || — || October 23, 2008 || Kitt Peak || Spacewatch || — || align=right data-sort-value="0.71" | 710 m || 
|-id=829 bgcolor=#fefefe
| 481829 ||  || — || October 20, 2008 || Mount Lemmon || Mount Lemmon Survey || — || align=right data-sort-value="0.78" | 780 m || 
|-id=830 bgcolor=#fefefe
| 481830 ||  || — || October 30, 2008 || Socorro || LINEAR || — || align=right data-sort-value="0.88" | 880 m || 
|-id=831 bgcolor=#fefefe
| 481831 ||  || — || September 27, 2008 || Mount Lemmon || Mount Lemmon Survey || NYS || align=right data-sort-value="0.61" | 610 m || 
|-id=832 bgcolor=#fefefe
| 481832 ||  || — || September 27, 2008 || Mount Lemmon || Mount Lemmon Survey || — || align=right | 1.1 km || 
|-id=833 bgcolor=#fefefe
| 481833 ||  || — || November 1, 2008 || Mount Lemmon || Mount Lemmon Survey || MAS || align=right data-sort-value="0.71" | 710 m || 
|-id=834 bgcolor=#E9E9E9
| 481834 ||  || — || November 8, 2008 || Kitt Peak || Spacewatch || — || align=right | 1.0 km || 
|-id=835 bgcolor=#E9E9E9
| 481835 ||  || — || November 4, 2004 || Kitt Peak || Spacewatch || — || align=right data-sort-value="0.98" | 980 m || 
|-id=836 bgcolor=#FA8072
| 481836 ||  || — || November 8, 2008 || Mount Lemmon || Mount Lemmon Survey || — || align=right | 1.6 km || 
|-id=837 bgcolor=#fefefe
| 481837 ||  || — || November 18, 2008 || Socorro || LINEAR || — || align=right | 1.0 km || 
|-id=838 bgcolor=#E9E9E9
| 481838 ||  || — || November 17, 2008 || Kitt Peak || Spacewatch || — || align=right data-sort-value="0.83" | 830 m || 
|-id=839 bgcolor=#d6d6d6
| 481839 ||  || — || November 17, 2008 || Kitt Peak || Spacewatch || 3:2 || align=right | 3.4 km || 
|-id=840 bgcolor=#d6d6d6
| 481840 ||  || — || November 17, 2008 || Kitt Peak || Spacewatch || Tj (2.97) || align=right | 3.9 km || 
|-id=841 bgcolor=#fefefe
| 481841 ||  || — || November 18, 2008 || Catalina || CSS || — || align=right data-sort-value="0.94" | 940 m || 
|-id=842 bgcolor=#E9E9E9
| 481842 ||  || — || November 19, 2008 || Mount Lemmon || Mount Lemmon Survey || — || align=right | 1.3 km || 
|-id=843 bgcolor=#d6d6d6
| 481843 ||  || — || November 20, 2008 || Kitt Peak || Spacewatch || 3:2 || align=right | 3.4 km || 
|-id=844 bgcolor=#FA8072
| 481844 ||  || — || November 26, 2008 || La Sagra || OAM Obs. || — || align=right | 2.5 km || 
|-id=845 bgcolor=#E9E9E9
| 481845 ||  || — || October 25, 2008 || Mount Lemmon || Mount Lemmon Survey || — || align=right | 1.4 km || 
|-id=846 bgcolor=#E9E9E9
| 481846 ||  || — || November 6, 2008 || Mount Lemmon || Mount Lemmon Survey || — || align=right data-sort-value="0.87" | 870 m || 
|-id=847 bgcolor=#FA8072
| 481847 ||  || — || November 17, 2008 || Catalina || CSS || H || align=right data-sort-value="0.91" | 910 m || 
|-id=848 bgcolor=#fefefe
| 481848 ||  || — || November 19, 2008 || Kitt Peak || Spacewatch || H || align=right data-sort-value="0.72" | 720 m || 
|-id=849 bgcolor=#fefefe
| 481849 ||  || — || November 18, 2008 || Socorro || LINEAR || — || align=right data-sort-value="0.80" | 800 m || 
|-id=850 bgcolor=#E9E9E9
| 481850 ||  || — || November 30, 2008 || Socorro || LINEAR || — || align=right | 1.3 km || 
|-id=851 bgcolor=#FA8072
| 481851 ||  || — || December 3, 2008 || Catalina || CSS || H || align=right data-sort-value="0.63" | 630 m || 
|-id=852 bgcolor=#d6d6d6
| 481852 ||  || — || December 4, 2008 || Socorro || LINEAR || Tj (2.94) || align=right | 4.4 km || 
|-id=853 bgcolor=#fefefe
| 481853 ||  || — || November 24, 2008 || Kitt Peak || Spacewatch || H || align=right data-sort-value="0.78" | 780 m || 
|-id=854 bgcolor=#E9E9E9
| 481854 ||  || — || November 19, 2008 || Kitt Peak || Spacewatch || — || align=right data-sort-value="0.89" | 890 m || 
|-id=855 bgcolor=#E9E9E9
| 481855 ||  || — || December 2, 2008 || Kitt Peak || Spacewatch || — || align=right | 2.6 km || 
|-id=856 bgcolor=#E9E9E9
| 481856 ||  || — || December 2, 2008 || Kitt Peak || Spacewatch || — || align=right data-sort-value="0.94" | 940 m || 
|-id=857 bgcolor=#fefefe
| 481857 ||  || — || December 4, 2008 || Mount Lemmon || Mount Lemmon Survey || H || align=right data-sort-value="0.90" | 900 m || 
|-id=858 bgcolor=#E9E9E9
| 481858 ||  || — || December 4, 2008 || Mount Lemmon || Mount Lemmon Survey || — || align=right data-sort-value="0.74" | 740 m || 
|-id=859 bgcolor=#E9E9E9
| 481859 ||  || — || December 23, 2008 || Dauban || F. Kugel || — || align=right | 1.0 km || 
|-id=860 bgcolor=#E9E9E9
| 481860 ||  || — || December 21, 2008 || Mount Lemmon || Mount Lemmon Survey || — || align=right | 1.2 km || 
|-id=861 bgcolor=#E9E9E9
| 481861 ||  || — || November 8, 2008 || Mount Lemmon || Mount Lemmon Survey || — || align=right | 1.6 km || 
|-id=862 bgcolor=#E9E9E9
| 481862 ||  || — || December 29, 2008 || Mount Lemmon || Mount Lemmon Survey || — || align=right | 1.5 km || 
|-id=863 bgcolor=#E9E9E9
| 481863 ||  || — || December 29, 2008 || Mount Lemmon || Mount Lemmon Survey || — || align=right | 1.7 km || 
|-id=864 bgcolor=#E9E9E9
| 481864 ||  || — || December 29, 2008 || Mount Lemmon || Mount Lemmon Survey || EUN || align=right | 1.4 km || 
|-id=865 bgcolor=#E9E9E9
| 481865 ||  || — || December 29, 2008 || Mount Lemmon || Mount Lemmon Survey || — || align=right data-sort-value="0.85" | 850 m || 
|-id=866 bgcolor=#E9E9E9
| 481866 ||  || — || December 29, 2008 || Mount Lemmon || Mount Lemmon Survey || — || align=right | 1.5 km || 
|-id=867 bgcolor=#E9E9E9
| 481867 ||  || — || December 30, 2008 || Kitt Peak || Spacewatch || — || align=right | 1.2 km || 
|-id=868 bgcolor=#E9E9E9
| 481868 ||  || — || November 23, 2008 || Mount Lemmon || Mount Lemmon Survey || EUN || align=right | 1.3 km || 
|-id=869 bgcolor=#E9E9E9
| 481869 ||  || — || December 29, 2008 || Kitt Peak || Spacewatch || — || align=right | 1.7 km || 
|-id=870 bgcolor=#E9E9E9
| 481870 ||  || — || December 21, 2008 || Kitt Peak || Spacewatch || — || align=right | 1.3 km || 
|-id=871 bgcolor=#E9E9E9
| 481871 ||  || — || December 29, 2008 || Kitt Peak || Spacewatch || — || align=right data-sort-value="0.66" | 660 m || 
|-id=872 bgcolor=#E9E9E9
| 481872 ||  || — || December 29, 2008 || Kitt Peak || Spacewatch || — || align=right data-sort-value="0.93" | 930 m || 
|-id=873 bgcolor=#E9E9E9
| 481873 ||  || — || November 21, 2008 || Kitt Peak || Spacewatch || — || align=right data-sort-value="0.86" | 860 m || 
|-id=874 bgcolor=#E9E9E9
| 481874 ||  || — || November 2, 2008 || Mount Lemmon || Mount Lemmon Survey || (5) || align=right data-sort-value="0.65" | 650 m || 
|-id=875 bgcolor=#E9E9E9
| 481875 ||  || — || December 29, 2008 || Kitt Peak || Spacewatch || — || align=right data-sort-value="0.83" | 830 m || 
|-id=876 bgcolor=#E9E9E9
| 481876 ||  || — || December 30, 2008 || Kitt Peak || Spacewatch || — || align=right data-sort-value="0.91" | 910 m || 
|-id=877 bgcolor=#E9E9E9
| 481877 ||  || — || December 30, 2008 || Kitt Peak || Spacewatch || — || align=right | 1.4 km || 
|-id=878 bgcolor=#E9E9E9
| 481878 ||  || — || December 30, 2008 || Kitt Peak || Spacewatch || — || align=right | 1.2 km || 
|-id=879 bgcolor=#E9E9E9
| 481879 ||  || — || January 16, 2005 || Kitt Peak || Spacewatch || EUN || align=right data-sort-value="0.88" | 880 m || 
|-id=880 bgcolor=#E9E9E9
| 481880 ||  || — || December 21, 2008 || Mount Lemmon || Mount Lemmon Survey || — || align=right data-sort-value="0.72" | 720 m || 
|-id=881 bgcolor=#E9E9E9
| 481881 ||  || — || December 31, 2008 || Kitt Peak || Spacewatch || — || align=right | 2.0 km || 
|-id=882 bgcolor=#E9E9E9
| 481882 ||  || — || December 22, 2008 || Kitt Peak || Spacewatch || — || align=right data-sort-value="0.78" | 780 m || 
|-id=883 bgcolor=#E9E9E9
| 481883 ||  || — || December 21, 2008 || Mount Lemmon || Mount Lemmon Survey || BRG || align=right | 1.3 km || 
|-id=884 bgcolor=#fefefe
| 481884 ||  || — || December 22, 2008 || Catalina || CSS || H || align=right data-sort-value="0.90" | 900 m || 
|-id=885 bgcolor=#E9E9E9
| 481885 ||  || — || December 30, 2008 || Kitt Peak || Spacewatch || — || align=right | 1.0 km || 
|-id=886 bgcolor=#E9E9E9
| 481886 ||  || — || December 29, 2008 || Kitt Peak || Spacewatch || — || align=right | 1.3 km || 
|-id=887 bgcolor=#d6d6d6
| 481887 ||  || — || January 2, 2009 || Mount Lemmon || Mount Lemmon Survey || 3:2critical || align=right | 3.2 km || 
|-id=888 bgcolor=#E9E9E9
| 481888 ||  || — || January 4, 2009 || Farra d'Isonzo || Farra d'Isonzo || — || align=right | 2.4 km || 
|-id=889 bgcolor=#E9E9E9
| 481889 ||  || — || January 3, 2009 || Kitt Peak || Spacewatch || — || align=right | 1.2 km || 
|-id=890 bgcolor=#E9E9E9
| 481890 ||  || — || February 4, 2005 || Kitt Peak || Spacewatch || — || align=right data-sort-value="0.64" | 640 m || 
|-id=891 bgcolor=#E9E9E9
| 481891 ||  || — || January 2, 2009 || Kitt Peak || Spacewatch || — || align=right | 1.2 km || 
|-id=892 bgcolor=#E9E9E9
| 481892 ||  || — || January 2, 2009 || Kitt Peak || Spacewatch || — || align=right | 1.5 km || 
|-id=893 bgcolor=#fefefe
| 481893 ||  || — || January 15, 2009 || Kitt Peak || Spacewatch || H || align=right data-sort-value="0.77" | 770 m || 
|-id=894 bgcolor=#E9E9E9
| 481894 ||  || — || November 1, 2008 || Mount Lemmon || Mount Lemmon Survey || — || align=right data-sort-value="0.97" | 970 m || 
|-id=895 bgcolor=#E9E9E9
| 481895 ||  || — || January 1, 2009 || Kitt Peak || Spacewatch || — || align=right | 1.1 km || 
|-id=896 bgcolor=#E9E9E9
| 481896 ||  || — || January 3, 2009 || Mount Lemmon || Mount Lemmon Survey || — || align=right | 1.5 km || 
|-id=897 bgcolor=#E9E9E9
| 481897 ||  || — || January 15, 2009 || Kitt Peak || Spacewatch || — || align=right data-sort-value="0.73" | 730 m || 
|-id=898 bgcolor=#E9E9E9
| 481898 ||  || — || January 3, 2009 || Mount Lemmon || Mount Lemmon Survey || JUN || align=right | 1.0 km || 
|-id=899 bgcolor=#E9E9E9
| 481899 ||  || — || January 3, 2009 || Mount Lemmon || Mount Lemmon Survey || EUN || align=right | 1.1 km || 
|-id=900 bgcolor=#E9E9E9
| 481900 ||  || — || October 31, 2008 || Mount Lemmon || Mount Lemmon Survey || — || align=right data-sort-value="0.89" | 890 m || 
|}

481901–482000 

|-bgcolor=#FA8072
| 481901 ||  || — || January 17, 2009 || Kitt Peak || Spacewatch || H || align=right data-sort-value="0.87" | 870 m || 
|-id=902 bgcolor=#E9E9E9
| 481902 ||  || — || January 18, 2009 || Socorro || LINEAR || — || align=right data-sort-value="0.90" | 900 m || 
|-id=903 bgcolor=#fefefe
| 481903 ||  || — || January 18, 2009 || Socorro || LINEAR || H || align=right data-sort-value="0.62" | 620 m || 
|-id=904 bgcolor=#FFC2E0
| 481904 ||  || — || January 25, 2009 || Catalina || CSS || AMO || align=right data-sort-value="0.45" | 450 m || 
|-id=905 bgcolor=#E9E9E9
| 481905 ||  || — || January 18, 2009 || Mount Lemmon || Mount Lemmon Survey || critical || align=right data-sort-value="0.98" | 980 m || 
|-id=906 bgcolor=#E9E9E9
| 481906 ||  || — || January 3, 2009 || Kitt Peak || Spacewatch || — || align=right | 1.3 km || 
|-id=907 bgcolor=#E9E9E9
| 481907 ||  || — || January 16, 2009 || Kitt Peak || Spacewatch || — || align=right | 1.1 km || 
|-id=908 bgcolor=#E9E9E9
| 481908 ||  || — || January 16, 2009 || Kitt Peak || Spacewatch || — || align=right | 1.5 km || 
|-id=909 bgcolor=#E9E9E9
| 481909 ||  || — || January 16, 2009 || Kitt Peak || Spacewatch || — || align=right | 1.1 km || 
|-id=910 bgcolor=#E9E9E9
| 481910 ||  || — || January 16, 2009 || Kitt Peak || Spacewatch || — || align=right | 1.1 km || 
|-id=911 bgcolor=#E9E9E9
| 481911 ||  || — || January 16, 2009 || Kitt Peak || Spacewatch || EUN || align=right | 1.1 km || 
|-id=912 bgcolor=#E9E9E9
| 481912 ||  || — || January 16, 2009 || Mount Lemmon || Mount Lemmon Survey || — || align=right data-sort-value="0.80" | 800 m || 
|-id=913 bgcolor=#E9E9E9
| 481913 ||  || — || December 1, 2008 || Mount Lemmon || Mount Lemmon Survey || — || align=right | 1.1 km || 
|-id=914 bgcolor=#E9E9E9
| 481914 ||  || — || January 2, 2009 || Kitt Peak || Spacewatch || — || align=right data-sort-value="0.82" | 820 m || 
|-id=915 bgcolor=#E9E9E9
| 481915 ||  || — || December 21, 2008 || Mount Lemmon || Mount Lemmon Survey || — || align=right data-sort-value="0.68" | 680 m || 
|-id=916 bgcolor=#E9E9E9
| 481916 ||  || — || January 30, 2009 || Catalina || CSS || — || align=right | 1.5 km || 
|-id=917 bgcolor=#E9E9E9
| 481917 ||  || — || December 22, 2008 || Mount Lemmon || Mount Lemmon Survey || ADE || align=right | 2.0 km || 
|-id=918 bgcolor=#FFC2E0
| 481918 ||  || — || January 30, 2009 || Siding Spring || SSS || APO +1km || align=right data-sort-value="0.80" | 800 m || 
|-id=919 bgcolor=#E9E9E9
| 481919 ||  || — || January 25, 2009 || Socorro || LINEAR || — || align=right | 1.3 km || 
|-id=920 bgcolor=#E9E9E9
| 481920 ||  || — || November 8, 2008 || Kitt Peak || Spacewatch || — || align=right | 1.5 km || 
|-id=921 bgcolor=#E9E9E9
| 481921 ||  || — || January 31, 2009 || Socorro || LINEAR || — || align=right | 1.5 km || 
|-id=922 bgcolor=#E9E9E9
| 481922 ||  || — || January 31, 2009 || Vail-Jarnac || Jarnac Obs. || — || align=right data-sort-value="0.92" | 920 m || 
|-id=923 bgcolor=#E9E9E9
| 481923 ||  || — || December 30, 2008 || Mount Lemmon || Mount Lemmon Survey || — || align=right data-sort-value="0.84" | 840 m || 
|-id=924 bgcolor=#E9E9E9
| 481924 ||  || — || January 20, 2009 || Catalina || CSS || — || align=right | 1.1 km || 
|-id=925 bgcolor=#E9E9E9
| 481925 ||  || — || January 2, 2009 || Mount Lemmon || Mount Lemmon Survey || — || align=right | 1.1 km || 
|-id=926 bgcolor=#E9E9E9
| 481926 ||  || — || January 25, 2009 || Kitt Peak || Spacewatch || — || align=right data-sort-value="0.73" | 730 m || 
|-id=927 bgcolor=#E9E9E9
| 481927 ||  || — || January 3, 2009 || Mount Lemmon || Mount Lemmon Survey || — || align=right | 1.5 km || 
|-id=928 bgcolor=#E9E9E9
| 481928 ||  || — || January 16, 2009 || Kitt Peak || Spacewatch || — || align=right | 1.8 km || 
|-id=929 bgcolor=#E9E9E9
| 481929 ||  || — || April 7, 2005 || Anderson Mesa || LONEOS || — || align=right | 3.0 km || 
|-id=930 bgcolor=#E9E9E9
| 481930 ||  || — || January 26, 2009 || Mount Lemmon || Mount Lemmon Survey || — || align=right | 1.2 km || 
|-id=931 bgcolor=#E9E9E9
| 481931 ||  || — || January 3, 2009 || Kitt Peak || Spacewatch || — || align=right data-sort-value="0.78" | 780 m || 
|-id=932 bgcolor=#fefefe
| 481932 ||  || — || January 31, 2009 || Kitt Peak || Spacewatch || H || align=right data-sort-value="0.82" | 820 m || 
|-id=933 bgcolor=#E9E9E9
| 481933 ||  || — || January 31, 2009 || Kitt Peak || Spacewatch || (5) || align=right data-sort-value="0.66" | 660 m || 
|-id=934 bgcolor=#E9E9E9
| 481934 ||  || — || November 24, 2008 || Mount Lemmon || Mount Lemmon Survey || — || align=right | 1.2 km || 
|-id=935 bgcolor=#E9E9E9
| 481935 ||  || — || January 31, 2009 || Kitt Peak || Spacewatch || — || align=right data-sort-value="0.64" | 640 m || 
|-id=936 bgcolor=#E9E9E9
| 481936 ||  || — || January 2, 2009 || Mount Lemmon || Mount Lemmon Survey || — || align=right | 1.2 km || 
|-id=937 bgcolor=#E9E9E9
| 481937 ||  || — || January 1, 2009 || Mount Lemmon || Mount Lemmon Survey || — || align=right | 2.1 km || 
|-id=938 bgcolor=#E9E9E9
| 481938 ||  || — || January 18, 2009 || Catalina || CSS || — || align=right | 1.3 km || 
|-id=939 bgcolor=#E9E9E9
| 481939 ||  || — || January 18, 2009 || Kitt Peak || Spacewatch || — || align=right | 1.4 km || 
|-id=940 bgcolor=#E9E9E9
| 481940 ||  || — || January 31, 2009 || Mount Lemmon || Mount Lemmon Survey || MAR || align=right | 1.0 km || 
|-id=941 bgcolor=#E9E9E9
| 481941 ||  || — || October 19, 2008 || Kitt Peak || Spacewatch || — || align=right | 1.3 km || 
|-id=942 bgcolor=#E9E9E9
| 481942 ||  || — || January 28, 2009 || Catalina || CSS || — || align=right data-sort-value="0.84" | 840 m || 
|-id=943 bgcolor=#fefefe
| 481943 ||  || — || February 3, 2009 || Kitt Peak || Spacewatch || H || align=right data-sort-value="0.66" | 660 m || 
|-id=944 bgcolor=#E9E9E9
| 481944 ||  || — || February 1, 2009 || Kitt Peak || Spacewatch || — || align=right | 1.1 km || 
|-id=945 bgcolor=#E9E9E9
| 481945 ||  || — || February 14, 2009 || Mount Lemmon || Mount Lemmon Survey || — || align=right | 1.6 km || 
|-id=946 bgcolor=#fefefe
| 481946 ||  || — || February 14, 2009 || La Sagra || OAM Obs. || H || align=right data-sort-value="0.76" | 760 m || 
|-id=947 bgcolor=#E9E9E9
| 481947 ||  || — || February 5, 2009 || Mount Lemmon || Mount Lemmon Survey || — || align=right | 1.6 km || 
|-id=948 bgcolor=#E9E9E9
| 481948 ||  || — || February 3, 2009 || Kitt Peak || Spacewatch || — || align=right data-sort-value="0.82" | 820 m || 
|-id=949 bgcolor=#fefefe
| 481949 ||  || — || February 19, 2009 || La Sagra || OAM Obs. || H || align=right data-sort-value="0.70" | 700 m || 
|-id=950 bgcolor=#E9E9E9
| 481950 ||  || — || February 16, 2009 || Kitt Peak || Spacewatch || — || align=right | 1.3 km || 
|-id=951 bgcolor=#E9E9E9
| 481951 ||  || — || January 31, 2009 || Mount Lemmon || Mount Lemmon Survey || — || align=right | 1.5 km || 
|-id=952 bgcolor=#E9E9E9
| 481952 ||  || — || February 19, 2009 || Catalina || CSS || — || align=right | 1.6 km || 
|-id=953 bgcolor=#E9E9E9
| 481953 ||  || — || February 26, 2009 || Kitt Peak || Spacewatch || — || align=right | 1.2 km || 
|-id=954 bgcolor=#E9E9E9
| 481954 ||  || — || March 8, 2005 || Mount Lemmon || Mount Lemmon Survey || (5) || align=right data-sort-value="0.58" | 580 m || 
|-id=955 bgcolor=#E9E9E9
| 481955 ||  || — || July 21, 2006 || Mount Lemmon || Mount Lemmon Survey || ADE || align=right | 2.7 km || 
|-id=956 bgcolor=#E9E9E9
| 481956 ||  || — || January 29, 2009 || Catalina || CSS || EUN || align=right | 1.4 km || 
|-id=957 bgcolor=#E9E9E9
| 481957 ||  || — || February 4, 2009 || Mount Lemmon || Mount Lemmon Survey || — || align=right | 2.4 km || 
|-id=958 bgcolor=#E9E9E9
| 481958 ||  || — || February 27, 2009 || Kitt Peak || Spacewatch || (5) || align=right data-sort-value="0.71" | 710 m || 
|-id=959 bgcolor=#E9E9E9
| 481959 ||  || — || February 27, 2009 || Kitt Peak || Spacewatch || (5) || align=right data-sort-value="0.82" | 820 m || 
|-id=960 bgcolor=#fefefe
| 481960 ||  || — || February 24, 2009 || Catalina || CSS || H || align=right data-sort-value="0.84" | 840 m || 
|-id=961 bgcolor=#E9E9E9
| 481961 ||  || — || February 24, 2009 || Catalina || CSS || RAF || align=right | 1.1 km || 
|-id=962 bgcolor=#E9E9E9
| 481962 ||  || — || February 28, 2009 || Kitt Peak || Spacewatch || — || align=right | 1.5 km || 
|-id=963 bgcolor=#E9E9E9
| 481963 ||  || — || September 14, 2007 || Mount Lemmon || Mount Lemmon Survey || — || align=right | 1.1 km || 
|-id=964 bgcolor=#E9E9E9
| 481964 ||  || — || February 28, 2009 || Kitt Peak || Spacewatch || — || align=right | 2.3 km || 
|-id=965 bgcolor=#FFC2E0
| 481965 ||  || — || March 2, 2009 || Mount Lemmon || Mount Lemmon Survey || APO || align=right data-sort-value="0.27" | 270 m || 
|-id=966 bgcolor=#E9E9E9
| 481966 ||  || — || March 2, 2009 || Mount Lemmon || Mount Lemmon Survey || — || align=right data-sort-value="0.93" | 930 m || 
|-id=967 bgcolor=#E9E9E9
| 481967 ||  || — || March 1, 2009 || Kitt Peak || Spacewatch || — || align=right data-sort-value="0.78" | 780 m || 
|-id=968 bgcolor=#E9E9E9
| 481968 ||  || — || January 25, 2009 || Kitt Peak || Spacewatch || — || align=right data-sort-value="0.94" | 940 m || 
|-id=969 bgcolor=#E9E9E9
| 481969 ||  || — || March 15, 2009 || La Sagra || OAM Obs. || — || align=right | 2.2 km || 
|-id=970 bgcolor=#E9E9E9
| 481970 ||  || — || January 20, 2009 || Mount Lemmon || Mount Lemmon Survey || EUN || align=right | 1.3 km || 
|-id=971 bgcolor=#E9E9E9
| 481971 ||  || — || February 28, 2009 || Kitt Peak || Spacewatch || — || align=right data-sort-value="0.76" | 760 m || 
|-id=972 bgcolor=#E9E9E9
| 481972 ||  || — || January 19, 2009 || Mount Lemmon || Mount Lemmon Survey || — || align=right | 1.0 km || 
|-id=973 bgcolor=#E9E9E9
| 481973 ||  || — || March 2, 2009 || Mount Lemmon || Mount Lemmon Survey || — || align=right | 2.1 km || 
|-id=974 bgcolor=#E9E9E9
| 481974 ||  || — || March 1, 2009 || Kitt Peak || Spacewatch || — || align=right | 1.3 km || 
|-id=975 bgcolor=#E9E9E9
| 481975 ||  || — || March 29, 2009 || Kitt Peak || Spacewatch || — || align=right | 1.5 km || 
|-id=976 bgcolor=#E9E9E9
| 481976 ||  || — || March 31, 2009 || Kitt Peak || Spacewatch || — || align=right | 1.8 km || 
|-id=977 bgcolor=#E9E9E9
| 481977 ||  || — || March 21, 2009 || Kitt Peak || Spacewatch || — || align=right | 2.3 km || 
|-id=978 bgcolor=#E9E9E9
| 481978 ||  || — || March 30, 2009 || Mount Lemmon || Mount Lemmon Survey || — || align=right | 2.0 km || 
|-id=979 bgcolor=#E9E9E9
| 481979 ||  || — || April 12, 2009 || Altschwendt || W. Ries || — || align=right | 1.3 km || 
|-id=980 bgcolor=#E9E9E9
| 481980 ||  || — || April 19, 2009 || Kitt Peak || Spacewatch || WIT || align=right | 1.0 km || 
|-id=981 bgcolor=#E9E9E9
| 481981 ||  || — || April 21, 2009 || Kitt Peak || Spacewatch || (5) || align=right data-sort-value="0.79" | 790 m || 
|-id=982 bgcolor=#E9E9E9
| 481982 ||  || — || April 24, 2009 || Mount Lemmon || Mount Lemmon Survey || — || align=right | 2.5 km || 
|-id=983 bgcolor=#E9E9E9
| 481983 ||  || — || April 27, 2009 || Kitt Peak || Spacewatch || — || align=right | 1.5 km || 
|-id=984 bgcolor=#FFC2E0
| 481984 Cernunnos ||  ||  || May 20, 2009 || Vicques || M. Ory || AMO +1km || align=right data-sort-value="0.90" | 900 m || 
|-id=985 bgcolor=#FFC2E0
| 481985 ||  || — || May 26, 2009 || Kitt Peak || Spacewatch || AMO +1km || align=right data-sort-value="0.98" | 980 m || 
|-id=986 bgcolor=#d6d6d6
| 481986 ||  || — || October 29, 2005 || Catalina || CSS || — || align=right | 2.1 km || 
|-id=987 bgcolor=#C2FFFF
| 481987 ||  || — || May 26, 2009 || Mount Lemmon || Mount Lemmon Survey || L5 || align=right | 11 km || 
|-id=988 bgcolor=#fefefe
| 481988 ||  || — || July 28, 2009 || Catalina || CSS || — || align=right data-sort-value="0.65" | 650 m || 
|-id=989 bgcolor=#FFC2E0
| 481989 ||  || — || August 28, 2009 || Socorro || LINEAR || AMOcritical || align=right data-sort-value="0.37" | 370 m || 
|-id=990 bgcolor=#d6d6d6
| 481990 ||  || — || August 15, 2009 || Kitt Peak || Spacewatch || — || align=right | 4.2 km || 
|-id=991 bgcolor=#fefefe
| 481991 ||  || — || August 26, 2009 || La Sagra || OAM Obs. || — || align=right data-sort-value="0.68" | 680 m || 
|-id=992 bgcolor=#fefefe
| 481992 ||  || — || September 12, 2009 || Kitt Peak || Spacewatch || — || align=right data-sort-value="0.62" | 620 m || 
|-id=993 bgcolor=#fefefe
| 481993 Melaniezander ||  ||  || September 13, 2009 || ESA OGS || M. Busch, R. Kresken || — || align=right data-sort-value="0.74" | 740 m || 
|-id=994 bgcolor=#fefefe
| 481994 ||  || — || September 14, 2009 || Catalina || CSS || — || align=right data-sort-value="0.67" | 670 m || 
|-id=995 bgcolor=#d6d6d6
| 481995 ||  || — || September 16, 2009 || Kitt Peak || Spacewatch || — || align=right | 4.0 km || 
|-id=996 bgcolor=#fefefe
| 481996 ||  || — || August 19, 2009 || Kitt Peak || Spacewatch || — || align=right data-sort-value="0.59" | 590 m || 
|-id=997 bgcolor=#fefefe
| 481997 ||  || — || September 17, 2009 || Kitt Peak || Spacewatch || — || align=right | 1.3 km || 
|-id=998 bgcolor=#fefefe
| 481998 ||  || — || February 23, 2007 || Mount Lemmon || Mount Lemmon Survey || — || align=right data-sort-value="0.62" | 620 m || 
|-id=999 bgcolor=#fefefe
| 481999 ||  || — || September 17, 2009 || Kitt Peak || Spacewatch || — || align=right data-sort-value="0.62" | 620 m || 
|-id=000 bgcolor=#fefefe
| 482000 ||  || — || November 17, 2006 || Kitt Peak || Spacewatch || — || align=right data-sort-value="0.75" | 750 m || 
|}

References

External links 
 Discovery Circumstances: Numbered Minor Planets (480001)–(485000) (IAU Minor Planet Center)

0481